

128001–128100 

|-bgcolor=#E9E9E9
| 128001 ||  || — || April 30, 2003 || Kitt Peak || Spacewatch || — || align=right | 2.5 km || 
|-id=002 bgcolor=#E9E9E9
| 128002 ||  || — || April 29, 2003 || Anderson Mesa || LONEOS || — || align=right | 1.5 km || 
|-id=003 bgcolor=#E9E9E9
| 128003 ||  || — || April 27, 2003 || Anderson Mesa || LONEOS || — || align=right | 4.1 km || 
|-id=004 bgcolor=#fefefe
| 128004 ||  || — || April 23, 2003 || Bergisch Gladbach || W. Bickel || FLO || align=right | 2.1 km || 
|-id=005 bgcolor=#E9E9E9
| 128005 ||  || — || April 24, 2003 || Anderson Mesa || LONEOS || HEN || align=right | 2.0 km || 
|-id=006 bgcolor=#d6d6d6
| 128006 ||  || — || April 25, 2003 || Kitt Peak || Spacewatch || KAR || align=right | 1.8 km || 
|-id=007 bgcolor=#fefefe
| 128007 ||  || — || April 29, 2003 || Socorro || LINEAR || NYS || align=right | 1.6 km || 
|-id=008 bgcolor=#d6d6d6
| 128008 ||  || — || May 1, 2003 || Socorro || LINEAR || EOS || align=right | 4.7 km || 
|-id=009 bgcolor=#E9E9E9
| 128009 ||  || — || May 1, 2003 || Socorro || LINEAR || — || align=right | 4.1 km || 
|-id=010 bgcolor=#E9E9E9
| 128010 ||  || — || May 2, 2003 || Socorro || LINEAR || — || align=right | 2.8 km || 
|-id=011 bgcolor=#E9E9E9
| 128011 ||  || — || May 2, 2003 || Socorro || LINEAR || — || align=right | 4.0 km || 
|-id=012 bgcolor=#d6d6d6
| 128012 ||  || — || May 3, 2003 || Kitt Peak || Spacewatch || THM || align=right | 5.0 km || 
|-id=013 bgcolor=#d6d6d6
| 128013 ||  || — || May 2, 2003 || Kitt Peak || Spacewatch || HYG || align=right | 5.0 km || 
|-id=014 bgcolor=#fefefe
| 128014 ||  || — || May 2, 2003 || Haleakala || NEAT || FLO || align=right | 2.0 km || 
|-id=015 bgcolor=#d6d6d6
| 128015 ||  || — || May 2, 2003 || Socorro || LINEAR || VER || align=right | 6.3 km || 
|-id=016 bgcolor=#E9E9E9
| 128016 ||  || — || May 6, 2003 || Catalina || CSS || — || align=right | 3.3 km || 
|-id=017 bgcolor=#fefefe
| 128017 ||  || — || May 6, 2003 || Kitt Peak || Spacewatch || — || align=right | 1.4 km || 
|-id=018 bgcolor=#d6d6d6
| 128018 ||  || — || May 7, 2003 || Catalina || CSS || — || align=right | 8.1 km || 
|-id=019 bgcolor=#E9E9E9
| 128019 ||  || — || May 5, 2003 || Kitt Peak || Spacewatch || — || align=right | 2.1 km || 
|-id=020 bgcolor=#d6d6d6
| 128020 ||  || — || May 8, 2003 || Socorro || LINEAR || — || align=right | 4.5 km || 
|-id=021 bgcolor=#fefefe
| 128021 ||  || — || May 10, 2003 || Kitt Peak || Spacewatch || NYS || align=right | 1.1 km || 
|-id=022 bgcolor=#E9E9E9
| 128022 Peterantreasian ||  ||  || May 2, 2003 || Catalina || CSS || — || align=right | 4.4 km || 
|-id=023 bgcolor=#fefefe
| 128023 || 2003 KE || — || May 20, 2003 || Anderson Mesa || LONEOS || — || align=right | 1.8 km || 
|-id=024 bgcolor=#E9E9E9
| 128024 || 2003 KH || — || May 20, 2003 || Anderson Mesa || LONEOS || — || align=right | 4.5 km || 
|-id=025 bgcolor=#fefefe
| 128025 || 2003 KK || — || May 20, 2003 || Haleakala || NEAT || — || align=right | 1.7 km || 
|-id=026 bgcolor=#fefefe
| 128026 ||  || — || May 22, 2003 || Nogales || Tenagra II Obs. || — || align=right | 1.4 km || 
|-id=027 bgcolor=#d6d6d6
| 128027 ||  || — || May 22, 2003 || Reedy Creek || J. Broughton || LUT || align=right | 8.4 km || 
|-id=028 bgcolor=#d6d6d6
| 128028 ||  || — || May 22, 2003 || Kitt Peak || Spacewatch || — || align=right | 6.4 km || 
|-id=029 bgcolor=#fefefe
| 128029 ||  || — || May 23, 2003 || Nashville || R. Clingan || — || align=right | 1.6 km || 
|-id=030 bgcolor=#fefefe
| 128030 ||  || — || May 25, 2003 || Kitt Peak || Spacewatch || — || align=right | 1.0 km || 
|-id=031 bgcolor=#E9E9E9
| 128031 ||  || — || May 25, 2003 || Anderson Mesa || LONEOS || — || align=right | 1.8 km || 
|-id=032 bgcolor=#fefefe
| 128032 ||  || — || May 27, 2003 || Haleakala || NEAT || — || align=right | 1.5 km || 
|-id=033 bgcolor=#E9E9E9
| 128033 ||  || — || May 27, 2003 || Haleakala || NEAT || — || align=right | 5.5 km || 
|-id=034 bgcolor=#d6d6d6
| 128034 ||  || — || May 27, 2003 || Haleakala || NEAT || TEL || align=right | 2.9 km || 
|-id=035 bgcolor=#fefefe
| 128035 ||  || — || May 29, 2003 || Socorro || LINEAR || V || align=right | 1.0 km || 
|-id=036 bgcolor=#fefefe
| 128036 Rafaelnadal ||  ||  || May 28, 2003 || Majorca || OAM Obs. || — || align=right | 1.7 km || 
|-id=037 bgcolor=#fefefe
| 128037 ||  || — || May 26, 2003 || Reedy Creek || J. Broughton || — || align=right | 1.5 km || 
|-id=038 bgcolor=#d6d6d6
| 128038 ||  || — || May 30, 2003 || Cerro Tololo || M. W. Buie || HYG || align=right | 3.9 km || 
|-id=039 bgcolor=#E9E9E9
| 128039 ||  || — || May 29, 2003 || Socorro || LINEAR || — || align=right | 3.5 km || 
|-id=040 bgcolor=#fefefe
| 128040 ||  || — || May 30, 2003 || Socorro || LINEAR || FLO || align=right | 1.3 km || 
|-id=041 bgcolor=#E9E9E9
| 128041 ||  || — || May 30, 2003 || Socorro || LINEAR || — || align=right | 3.1 km || 
|-id=042 bgcolor=#fefefe
| 128042 || 2003 LU || — || June 2, 2003 || Kitt Peak || Spacewatch || — || align=right | 1.5 km || 
|-id=043 bgcolor=#E9E9E9
| 128043 ||  || — || June 2, 2003 || Kitt Peak || Spacewatch || — || align=right | 5.9 km || 
|-id=044 bgcolor=#E9E9E9
| 128044 ||  || — || June 1, 2003 || Kitt Peak || Spacewatch || — || align=right | 2.4 km || 
|-id=045 bgcolor=#d6d6d6
| 128045 ||  || — || June 6, 2003 || Reedy Creek || J. Broughton || THM || align=right | 4.3 km || 
|-id=046 bgcolor=#E9E9E9
| 128046 ||  || — || June 23, 2003 || Anderson Mesa || LONEOS || MAR || align=right | 3.0 km || 
|-id=047 bgcolor=#E9E9E9
| 128047 ||  || — || June 21, 2003 || Anderson Mesa || LONEOS || RAF || align=right | 2.2 km || 
|-id=048 bgcolor=#fefefe
| 128048 ||  || — || June 25, 2003 || Socorro || LINEAR || — || align=right | 1.5 km || 
|-id=049 bgcolor=#d6d6d6
| 128049 ||  || — || June 26, 2003 || Socorro || LINEAR || — || align=right | 6.2 km || 
|-id=050 bgcolor=#d6d6d6
| 128050 ||  || — || June 26, 2003 || Haleakala || NEAT || — || align=right | 6.4 km || 
|-id=051 bgcolor=#E9E9E9
| 128051 ||  || — || June 26, 2003 || Haleakala || NEAT || — || align=right | 3.0 km || 
|-id=052 bgcolor=#E9E9E9
| 128052 ||  || — || June 28, 2003 || Socorro || LINEAR || — || align=right | 2.2 km || 
|-id=053 bgcolor=#d6d6d6
| 128053 ||  || — || June 29, 2003 || Socorro || LINEAR || — || align=right | 8.0 km || 
|-id=054 bgcolor=#d6d6d6
| 128054 Eranyavneh ||  ||  || June 28, 2003 || Wise || D. Polishook || — || align=right | 6.8 km || 
|-id=055 bgcolor=#E9E9E9
| 128055 ||  || — || June 22, 2003 || Anderson Mesa || LONEOS || — || align=right | 3.0 km || 
|-id=056 bgcolor=#d6d6d6
| 128056 ||  || — || June 30, 2003 || Socorro || LINEAR || ALA || align=right | 8.2 km || 
|-id=057 bgcolor=#fefefe
| 128057 || 2003 NR || — || July 1, 2003 || Haleakala || NEAT || — || align=right | 3.3 km || 
|-id=058 bgcolor=#E9E9E9
| 128058 ||  || — || July 3, 2003 || Reedy Creek || J. Broughton || — || align=right | 3.0 km || 
|-id=059 bgcolor=#d6d6d6
| 128059 ||  || — || July 1, 2003 || Haleakala || NEAT || 3:2 || align=right | 14 km || 
|-id=060 bgcolor=#d6d6d6
| 128060 ||  || — || July 4, 2003 || Anderson Mesa || LONEOS || — || align=right | 8.0 km || 
|-id=061 bgcolor=#d6d6d6
| 128061 ||  || — || July 2, 2003 || Haleakala || NEAT || — || align=right | 6.4 km || 
|-id=062 bgcolor=#d6d6d6
| 128062 Szrogh ||  ||  || July 6, 2003 || Piszkéstető || K. Sárneczky, B. Sipőcz || — || align=right | 5.4 km || 
|-id=063 bgcolor=#fefefe
| 128063 ||  || — || July 8, 2003 || Palomar || NEAT || NYS || align=right | 1.4 km || 
|-id=064 bgcolor=#E9E9E9
| 128064 ||  || — || July 1, 2003 || Socorro || LINEAR || — || align=right | 2.0 km || 
|-id=065 bgcolor=#d6d6d6
| 128065 Bartbenjamin || 2003 OK ||  || July 19, 2003 || Desert Moon || B. L. Stevens || — || align=right | 3.5 km || 
|-id=066 bgcolor=#fefefe
| 128066 || 2003 OM || — || July 17, 2003 || Reedy Creek || J. Broughton || NYS || align=right | 1.4 km || 
|-id=067 bgcolor=#d6d6d6
| 128067 ||  || — || July 22, 2003 || Campo Imperatore || CINEOS || — || align=right | 4.3 km || 
|-id=068 bgcolor=#d6d6d6
| 128068 ||  || — || July 22, 2003 || Haleakala || NEAT || — || align=right | 5.0 km || 
|-id=069 bgcolor=#d6d6d6
| 128069 ||  || — || July 24, 2003 || Campo Imperatore || CINEOS || EOS || align=right | 4.2 km || 
|-id=070 bgcolor=#E9E9E9
| 128070 ||  || — || July 25, 2003 || Reedy Creek || J. Broughton || — || align=right | 5.4 km || 
|-id=071 bgcolor=#d6d6d6
| 128071 ||  || — || July 25, 2003 || Socorro || LINEAR || — || align=right | 8.1 km || 
|-id=072 bgcolor=#d6d6d6
| 128072 ||  || — || July 25, 2003 || Socorro || LINEAR || — || align=right | 3.6 km || 
|-id=073 bgcolor=#E9E9E9
| 128073 ||  || — || July 27, 2003 || Reedy Creek || J. Broughton || DOR || align=right | 4.7 km || 
|-id=074 bgcolor=#E9E9E9
| 128074 ||  || — || July 27, 2003 || Reedy Creek || J. Broughton || — || align=right | 2.6 km || 
|-id=075 bgcolor=#d6d6d6
| 128075 ||  || — || July 22, 2003 || Palomar || NEAT || — || align=right | 5.7 km || 
|-id=076 bgcolor=#d6d6d6
| 128076 ||  || — || July 22, 2003 || Palomar || NEAT || — || align=right | 7.4 km || 
|-id=077 bgcolor=#fefefe
| 128077 ||  || — || July 26, 2003 || Socorro || LINEAR || CHL || align=right | 3.9 km || 
|-id=078 bgcolor=#E9E9E9
| 128078 ||  || — || July 29, 2003 || Campo Imperatore || CINEOS || — || align=right | 2.9 km || 
|-id=079 bgcolor=#d6d6d6
| 128079 ||  || — || July 29, 2003 || Campo Imperatore || CINEOS || — || align=right | 5.5 km || 
|-id=080 bgcolor=#E9E9E9
| 128080 ||  || — || July 31, 2003 || Reedy Creek || J. Broughton || — || align=right | 2.4 km || 
|-id=081 bgcolor=#E9E9E9
| 128081 ||  || — || July 29, 2003 || Reedy Creek || J. Broughton || — || align=right | 2.6 km || 
|-id=082 bgcolor=#d6d6d6
| 128082 ||  || — || July 22, 2003 || Haleakala || NEAT || EOS || align=right | 3.7 km || 
|-id=083 bgcolor=#E9E9E9
| 128083 ||  || — || July 24, 2003 || Palomar || NEAT || — || align=right | 2.1 km || 
|-id=084 bgcolor=#d6d6d6
| 128084 ||  || — || July 24, 2003 || Palomar || NEAT || — || align=right | 4.8 km || 
|-id=085 bgcolor=#E9E9E9
| 128085 ||  || — || July 24, 2003 || Palomar || NEAT || AGN || align=right | 2.2 km || 
|-id=086 bgcolor=#d6d6d6
| 128086 ||  || — || July 30, 2003 || Campo Imperatore || CINEOS || — || align=right | 6.4 km || 
|-id=087 bgcolor=#E9E9E9
| 128087 || 2003 PH || — || August 1, 2003 || Reedy Creek || J. Broughton || — || align=right | 1.9 km || 
|-id=088 bgcolor=#d6d6d6
| 128088 || 2003 PL || — || August 1, 2003 || Črni Vrh || J. Skvarč || — || align=right | 6.1 km || 
|-id=089 bgcolor=#E9E9E9
| 128089 ||  || — || August 2, 2003 || Haleakala || NEAT || — || align=right | 4.2 km || 
|-id=090 bgcolor=#E9E9E9
| 128090 ||  || — || August 2, 2003 || Reedy Creek || J. Broughton || — || align=right | 2.4 km || 
|-id=091 bgcolor=#d6d6d6
| 128091 ||  || — || August 1, 2003 || Socorro || LINEAR || CHA || align=right | 3.3 km || 
|-id=092 bgcolor=#d6d6d6
| 128092 ||  || — || August 1, 2003 || Socorro || LINEAR || — || align=right | 7.4 km || 
|-id=093 bgcolor=#E9E9E9
| 128093 ||  || — || August 1, 2003 || Haleakala || NEAT || AGN || align=right | 2.3 km || 
|-id=094 bgcolor=#d6d6d6
| 128094 ||  || — || August 2, 2003 || Haleakala || NEAT || — || align=right | 3.5 km || 
|-id=095 bgcolor=#d6d6d6
| 128095 ||  || — || August 2, 2003 || Haleakala || NEAT || EOS || align=right | 3.2 km || 
|-id=096 bgcolor=#fefefe
| 128096 ||  || — || August 2, 2003 || Haleakala || NEAT || — || align=right | 1.5 km || 
|-id=097 bgcolor=#d6d6d6
| 128097 ||  || — || August 4, 2003 || Socorro || LINEAR || HYG || align=right | 4.9 km || 
|-id=098 bgcolor=#E9E9E9
| 128098 ||  || — || August 4, 2003 || Socorro || LINEAR || — || align=right | 3.3 km || 
|-id=099 bgcolor=#d6d6d6
| 128099 ||  || — || August 4, 2003 || Socorro || LINEAR || — || align=right | 3.4 km || 
|-id=100 bgcolor=#d6d6d6
| 128100 ||  || — || August 3, 2003 || Needville || W. G. Dillon, J. Dellinger || HYG || align=right | 4.6 km || 
|}

128101–128200 

|-bgcolor=#d6d6d6
| 128101 ||  || — || August 5, 2003 || Bergisch Gladbach || W. Bickel || BRA || align=right | 2.6 km || 
|-id=102 bgcolor=#E9E9E9
| 128102 ||  || — || August 4, 2003 || Socorro || LINEAR || — || align=right | 2.4 km || 
|-id=103 bgcolor=#d6d6d6
| 128103 ||  || — || August 19, 2003 || Campo Imperatore || CINEOS || KOR || align=right | 2.9 km || 
|-id=104 bgcolor=#d6d6d6
| 128104 ||  || — || August 18, 2003 || Campo Imperatore || CINEOS || — || align=right | 4.6 km || 
|-id=105 bgcolor=#d6d6d6
| 128105 ||  || — || August 18, 2003 || Campo Imperatore || CINEOS || — || align=right | 4.9 km || 
|-id=106 bgcolor=#d6d6d6
| 128106 ||  || — || August 21, 2003 || Palomar || NEAT || — || align=right | 6.7 km || 
|-id=107 bgcolor=#E9E9E9
| 128107 ||  || — || August 20, 2003 || Reedy Creek || J. Broughton || — || align=right | 5.0 km || 
|-id=108 bgcolor=#E9E9E9
| 128108 ||  || — || August 22, 2003 || Palomar || NEAT || JUN || align=right | 2.0 km || 
|-id=109 bgcolor=#E9E9E9
| 128109 ||  || — || August 20, 2003 || Palomar || NEAT || EUN || align=right | 2.6 km || 
|-id=110 bgcolor=#d6d6d6
| 128110 ||  || — || August 20, 2003 || Palomar || NEAT || — || align=right | 6.2 km || 
|-id=111 bgcolor=#E9E9E9
| 128111 ||  || — || August 22, 2003 || Palomar || NEAT || — || align=right | 3.9 km || 
|-id=112 bgcolor=#d6d6d6
| 128112 ||  || — || August 22, 2003 || Palomar || NEAT || THM || align=right | 4.4 km || 
|-id=113 bgcolor=#E9E9E9
| 128113 ||  || — || August 22, 2003 || Socorro || LINEAR || — || align=right | 5.2 km || 
|-id=114 bgcolor=#d6d6d6
| 128114 ||  || — || August 22, 2003 || Palomar || NEAT || — || align=right | 7.2 km || 
|-id=115 bgcolor=#d6d6d6
| 128115 ||  || — || August 22, 2003 || Socorro || LINEAR || — || align=right | 5.1 km || 
|-id=116 bgcolor=#E9E9E9
| 128116 ||  || — || August 22, 2003 || Reedy Creek || J. Broughton || — || align=right | 5.9 km || 
|-id=117 bgcolor=#d6d6d6
| 128117 ||  || — || August 22, 2003 || Haleakala || NEAT || LAU || align=right | 2.5 km || 
|-id=118 bgcolor=#d6d6d6
| 128118 ||  || — || August 22, 2003 || Palomar || NEAT || — || align=right | 5.9 km || 
|-id=119 bgcolor=#d6d6d6
| 128119 ||  || — || August 22, 2003 || Palomar || NEAT || — || align=right | 4.2 km || 
|-id=120 bgcolor=#d6d6d6
| 128120 ||  || — || August 22, 2003 || Palomar || NEAT || KOR || align=right | 2.8 km || 
|-id=121 bgcolor=#d6d6d6
| 128121 ||  || — || August 22, 2003 || Palomar || NEAT || 3:2 || align=right | 7.7 km || 
|-id=122 bgcolor=#d6d6d6
| 128122 ||  || — || August 22, 2003 || Palomar || NEAT || — || align=right | 4.2 km || 
|-id=123 bgcolor=#d6d6d6
| 128123 ||  || — || August 22, 2003 || Palomar || NEAT || — || align=right | 6.3 km || 
|-id=124 bgcolor=#d6d6d6
| 128124 ||  || — || August 22, 2003 || Socorro || LINEAR || — || align=right | 5.9 km || 
|-id=125 bgcolor=#d6d6d6
| 128125 ||  || — || August 22, 2003 || Socorro || LINEAR || KAR || align=right | 2.7 km || 
|-id=126 bgcolor=#d6d6d6
| 128126 ||  || — || August 22, 2003 || Socorro || LINEAR || SHU3:2 || align=right | 10 km || 
|-id=127 bgcolor=#d6d6d6
| 128127 ||  || — || August 22, 2003 || Socorro || LINEAR || — || align=right | 3.6 km || 
|-id=128 bgcolor=#d6d6d6
| 128128 ||  || — || August 22, 2003 || Socorro || LINEAR || 7:4 || align=right | 7.9 km || 
|-id=129 bgcolor=#E9E9E9
| 128129 ||  || — || August 22, 2003 || Socorro || LINEAR || GEF || align=right | 2.6 km || 
|-id=130 bgcolor=#E9E9E9
| 128130 ||  || — || August 23, 2003 || Socorro || LINEAR || — || align=right | 3.5 km || 
|-id=131 bgcolor=#d6d6d6
| 128131 ||  || — || August 23, 2003 || Socorro || LINEAR || — || align=right | 5.4 km || 
|-id=132 bgcolor=#d6d6d6
| 128132 ||  || — || August 23, 2003 || Socorro || LINEAR || KOR || align=right | 2.8 km || 
|-id=133 bgcolor=#d6d6d6
| 128133 ||  || — || August 24, 2003 || Palomar || NEAT || EOS || align=right | 4.0 km || 
|-id=134 bgcolor=#d6d6d6
| 128134 ||  || — || August 24, 2003 || Socorro || LINEAR || — || align=right | 7.1 km || 
|-id=135 bgcolor=#fefefe
| 128135 ||  || — || August 20, 2003 || Palomar || NEAT || V || align=right | 1.1 km || 
|-id=136 bgcolor=#d6d6d6
| 128136 ||  || — || August 22, 2003 || Haleakala || NEAT || — || align=right | 5.9 km || 
|-id=137 bgcolor=#d6d6d6
| 128137 ||  || — || August 23, 2003 || Socorro || LINEAR || EOS || align=right | 4.1 km || 
|-id=138 bgcolor=#d6d6d6
| 128138 ||  || — || August 23, 2003 || Socorro || LINEAR || ALA || align=right | 6.2 km || 
|-id=139 bgcolor=#d6d6d6
| 128139 ||  || — || August 23, 2003 || Socorro || LINEAR || — || align=right | 5.9 km || 
|-id=140 bgcolor=#d6d6d6
| 128140 ||  || — || August 23, 2003 || Socorro || LINEAR || — || align=right | 4.7 km || 
|-id=141 bgcolor=#d6d6d6
| 128141 ||  || — || August 23, 2003 || Palomar || NEAT || — || align=right | 5.0 km || 
|-id=142 bgcolor=#d6d6d6
| 128142 ||  || — || August 23, 2003 || Socorro || LINEAR || KOR || align=right | 2.8 km || 
|-id=143 bgcolor=#d6d6d6
| 128143 ||  || — || August 23, 2003 || Socorro || LINEAR || — || align=right | 4.9 km || 
|-id=144 bgcolor=#d6d6d6
| 128144 ||  || — || August 23, 2003 || Socorro || LINEAR || — || align=right | 11 km || 
|-id=145 bgcolor=#d6d6d6
| 128145 ||  || — || August 23, 2003 || Socorro || LINEAR || — || align=right | 4.4 km || 
|-id=146 bgcolor=#d6d6d6
| 128146 ||  || — || August 25, 2003 || Palomar || NEAT || HYG || align=right | 5.0 km || 
|-id=147 bgcolor=#E9E9E9
| 128147 ||  || — || August 24, 2003 || Reedy Creek || J. Broughton || — || align=right | 4.6 km || 
|-id=148 bgcolor=#E9E9E9
| 128148 ||  || — || August 23, 2003 || Palomar || NEAT || — || align=right | 3.7 km || 
|-id=149 bgcolor=#d6d6d6
| 128149 ||  || — || August 25, 2003 || Palomar || NEAT || URS || align=right | 8.0 km || 
|-id=150 bgcolor=#d6d6d6
| 128150 ||  || — || August 24, 2003 || Socorro || LINEAR || — || align=right | 8.2 km || 
|-id=151 bgcolor=#E9E9E9
| 128151 ||  || — || August 24, 2003 || Socorro || LINEAR || — || align=right | 3.1 km || 
|-id=152 bgcolor=#d6d6d6
| 128152 ||  || — || August 25, 2003 || Reedy Creek || J. Broughton || — || align=right | 6.4 km || 
|-id=153 bgcolor=#d6d6d6
| 128153 ||  || — || August 23, 2003 || Socorro || LINEAR || — || align=right | 4.0 km || 
|-id=154 bgcolor=#E9E9E9
| 128154 ||  || — || August 25, 2003 || Socorro || LINEAR || — || align=right | 3.3 km || 
|-id=155 bgcolor=#d6d6d6
| 128155 ||  || — || August 25, 2003 || Palomar || NEAT || — || align=right | 3.9 km || 
|-id=156 bgcolor=#d6d6d6
| 128156 ||  || — || August 29, 2003 || Needville || J. Dellinger, P. Garossino || — || align=right | 5.0 km || 
|-id=157 bgcolor=#E9E9E9
| 128157 ||  || — || August 28, 2003 || Haleakala || NEAT || — || align=right | 3.5 km || 
|-id=158 bgcolor=#d6d6d6
| 128158 ||  || — || August 30, 2003 || Kitt Peak || Spacewatch || KOR || align=right | 2.2 km || 
|-id=159 bgcolor=#E9E9E9
| 128159 ||  || — || August 28, 2003 || Palomar || NEAT || WIT || align=right | 2.0 km || 
|-id=160 bgcolor=#E9E9E9
| 128160 ||  || — || August 28, 2003 || Haleakala || NEAT || — || align=right | 2.4 km || 
|-id=161 bgcolor=#d6d6d6
| 128161 ||  || — || August 31, 2003 || Kitt Peak || Spacewatch || — || align=right | 4.4 km || 
|-id=162 bgcolor=#d6d6d6
| 128162 ||  || — || August 31, 2003 || Kitt Peak || Spacewatch || — || align=right | 6.0 km || 
|-id=163 bgcolor=#E9E9E9
| 128163 ||  || — || August 31, 2003 || Haleakala || NEAT || — || align=right | 3.2 km || 
|-id=164 bgcolor=#d6d6d6
| 128164 ||  || — || August 30, 2003 || Reedy Creek || J. Broughton || MEL || align=right | 8.3 km || 
|-id=165 bgcolor=#d6d6d6
| 128165 ||  || — || August 29, 2003 || Socorro || LINEAR || HYG || align=right | 6.1 km || 
|-id=166 bgcolor=#d6d6d6
| 128166 Carora ||  ||  || August 27, 2003 || Mérida || I. R. Ferrín, C. Leal || — || align=right | 4.9 km || 
|-id=167 bgcolor=#d6d6d6
| 128167 ||  || — || August 30, 2003 || Kitt Peak || Spacewatch || — || align=right | 4.9 km || 
|-id=168 bgcolor=#d6d6d6
| 128168 ||  || — || August 31, 2003 || Socorro || LINEAR || — || align=right | 5.7 km || 
|-id=169 bgcolor=#d6d6d6
| 128169 ||  || — || September 2, 2003 || Socorro || LINEAR || HYG || align=right | 5.2 km || 
|-id=170 bgcolor=#d6d6d6
| 128170 ||  || — || September 2, 2003 || Socorro || LINEAR || — || align=right | 4.2 km || 
|-id=171 bgcolor=#d6d6d6
| 128171 ||  || — || September 1, 2003 || Socorro || LINEAR || — || align=right | 4.1 km || 
|-id=172 bgcolor=#d6d6d6
| 128172 ||  || — || September 1, 2003 || Socorro || LINEAR || — || align=right | 5.0 km || 
|-id=173 bgcolor=#E9E9E9
| 128173 ||  || — || September 5, 2003 || Haleakala || NEAT || — || align=right | 1.9 km || 
|-id=174 bgcolor=#d6d6d6
| 128174 ||  || — || September 1, 2003 || Socorro || LINEAR || — || align=right | 4.7 km || 
|-id=175 bgcolor=#d6d6d6
| 128175 ||  || — || September 4, 2003 || Socorro || LINEAR || 3:2 || align=right | 11 km || 
|-id=176 bgcolor=#d6d6d6
| 128176 ||  || — || September 1, 2003 || Bergisch Gladbach || W. Bickel || HYG || align=right | 6.1 km || 
|-id=177 bgcolor=#d6d6d6
| 128177 Griffioen ||  ||  || September 5, 2003 || Calvin College || A. Vanden Heuvel || — || align=right | 4.1 km || 
|-id=178 bgcolor=#d6d6d6
| 128178 ||  || — || September 13, 2003 || Haleakala || NEAT || EOS || align=right | 4.3 km || 
|-id=179 bgcolor=#d6d6d6
| 128179 ||  || — || September 14, 2003 || Haleakala || NEAT || — || align=right | 6.7 km || 
|-id=180 bgcolor=#d6d6d6
| 128180 ||  || — || September 15, 2003 || Haleakala || NEAT || — || align=right | 7.7 km || 
|-id=181 bgcolor=#E9E9E9
| 128181 ||  || — || September 13, 2003 || Haleakala || NEAT || HOF || align=right | 5.3 km || 
|-id=182 bgcolor=#d6d6d6
| 128182 ||  || — || September 15, 2003 || Anderson Mesa || LONEOS || — || align=right | 6.3 km || 
|-id=183 bgcolor=#E9E9E9
| 128183 ||  || — || September 15, 2003 || Haleakala || NEAT || — || align=right | 5.3 km || 
|-id=184 bgcolor=#E9E9E9
| 128184 ||  || — || September 14, 2003 || Palomar || NEAT || — || align=right | 3.8 km || 
|-id=185 bgcolor=#d6d6d6
| 128185 || 2003 SP || — || September 16, 2003 || Kitt Peak || Spacewatch || — || align=right | 6.5 km || 
|-id=186 bgcolor=#d6d6d6
| 128186 ||  || — || September 16, 2003 || Kitt Peak || Spacewatch || HYG || align=right | 3.8 km || 
|-id=187 bgcolor=#d6d6d6
| 128187 ||  || — || September 16, 2003 || Kitt Peak || Spacewatch || KOR || align=right | 2.1 km || 
|-id=188 bgcolor=#d6d6d6
| 128188 ||  || — || September 16, 2003 || Palomar || NEAT || — || align=right | 7.0 km || 
|-id=189 bgcolor=#d6d6d6
| 128189 ||  || — || September 17, 2003 || Desert Eagle || W. K. Y. Yeung || — || align=right | 6.4 km || 
|-id=190 bgcolor=#d6d6d6
| 128190 ||  || — || September 16, 2003 || Kitt Peak || Spacewatch || — || align=right | 4.0 km || 
|-id=191 bgcolor=#d6d6d6
| 128191 ||  || — || September 17, 2003 || Kitt Peak || Spacewatch || — || align=right | 5.9 km || 
|-id=192 bgcolor=#d6d6d6
| 128192 ||  || — || September 16, 2003 || Kitt Peak || Spacewatch || KOR || align=right | 2.8 km || 
|-id=193 bgcolor=#d6d6d6
| 128193 ||  || — || September 16, 2003 || Kitt Peak || Spacewatch || — || align=right | 7.5 km || 
|-id=194 bgcolor=#d6d6d6
| 128194 ||  || — || September 17, 2003 || Kitt Peak || Spacewatch || — || align=right | 6.2 km || 
|-id=195 bgcolor=#d6d6d6
| 128195 ||  || — || September 17, 2003 || Kitt Peak || Spacewatch || THM || align=right | 6.3 km || 
|-id=196 bgcolor=#d6d6d6
| 128196 ||  || — || September 18, 2003 || Palomar || NEAT || VER || align=right | 5.0 km || 
|-id=197 bgcolor=#d6d6d6
| 128197 ||  || — || September 16, 2003 || Anderson Mesa || LONEOS || SYL7:4 || align=right | 7.6 km || 
|-id=198 bgcolor=#d6d6d6
| 128198 ||  || — || September 16, 2003 || Palomar || NEAT || HIL3:2 || align=right | 11 km || 
|-id=199 bgcolor=#d6d6d6
| 128199 ||  || — || September 16, 2003 || Anderson Mesa || LONEOS || EOS || align=right | 3.6 km || 
|-id=200 bgcolor=#d6d6d6
| 128200 ||  || — || September 16, 2003 || Anderson Mesa || LONEOS || KOR || align=right | 2.5 km || 
|}

128201–128300 

|-bgcolor=#d6d6d6
| 128201 ||  || — || September 16, 2003 || Anderson Mesa || LONEOS || — || align=right | 5.2 km || 
|-id=202 bgcolor=#d6d6d6
| 128202 ||  || — || September 18, 2003 || Palomar || NEAT || HYG || align=right | 5.2 km || 
|-id=203 bgcolor=#d6d6d6
| 128203 ||  || — || September 18, 2003 || Palomar || NEAT || SHUTj (2.97) || align=right | 6.7 km || 
|-id=204 bgcolor=#d6d6d6
| 128204 ||  || — || September 16, 2003 || Socorro || LINEAR || CRO || align=right | 6.8 km || 
|-id=205 bgcolor=#d6d6d6
| 128205 ||  || — || September 16, 2003 || Kitt Peak || Spacewatch || — || align=right | 5.6 km || 
|-id=206 bgcolor=#d6d6d6
| 128206 ||  || — || September 17, 2003 || Anderson Mesa || LONEOS || — || align=right | 6.8 km || 
|-id=207 bgcolor=#d6d6d6
| 128207 ||  || — || September 17, 2003 || Socorro || LINEAR || — || align=right | 5.2 km || 
|-id=208 bgcolor=#d6d6d6
| 128208 ||  || — || September 17, 2003 || Kitt Peak || Spacewatch || 7:4 || align=right | 7.4 km || 
|-id=209 bgcolor=#d6d6d6
| 128209 ||  || — || September 18, 2003 || Anderson Mesa || LONEOS || 3:2 || align=right | 8.1 km || 
|-id=210 bgcolor=#d6d6d6
| 128210 ||  || — || September 19, 2003 || Socorro || LINEAR || — || align=right | 5.6 km || 
|-id=211 bgcolor=#d6d6d6
| 128211 ||  || — || September 17, 2003 || Kitt Peak || Spacewatch || — || align=right | 4.7 km || 
|-id=212 bgcolor=#d6d6d6
| 128212 ||  || — || September 18, 2003 || Kitt Peak || Spacewatch || — || align=right | 5.0 km || 
|-id=213 bgcolor=#d6d6d6
| 128213 ||  || — || September 18, 2003 || Kitt Peak || Spacewatch || — || align=right | 5.3 km || 
|-id=214 bgcolor=#d6d6d6
| 128214 ||  || — || September 18, 2003 || Kitt Peak || Spacewatch || KAR || align=right | 2.4 km || 
|-id=215 bgcolor=#E9E9E9
| 128215 ||  || — || September 19, 2003 || Kitt Peak || Spacewatch || — || align=right | 4.7 km || 
|-id=216 bgcolor=#d6d6d6
| 128216 ||  || — || September 19, 2003 || Kitt Peak || Spacewatch || — || align=right | 6.1 km || 
|-id=217 bgcolor=#E9E9E9
| 128217 ||  || — || September 19, 2003 || Kitt Peak || Spacewatch || — || align=right | 4.9 km || 
|-id=218 bgcolor=#d6d6d6
| 128218 ||  || — || September 19, 2003 || Kitt Peak || Spacewatch || HYG || align=right | 5.2 km || 
|-id=219 bgcolor=#d6d6d6
| 128219 ||  || — || September 18, 2003 || Socorro || LINEAR || — || align=right | 4.8 km || 
|-id=220 bgcolor=#d6d6d6
| 128220 ||  || — || September 18, 2003 || Campo Imperatore || CINEOS || KOR || align=right | 3.2 km || 
|-id=221 bgcolor=#d6d6d6
| 128221 ||  || — || September 20, 2003 || Kitt Peak || Spacewatch || — || align=right | 3.8 km || 
|-id=222 bgcolor=#d6d6d6
| 128222 ||  || — || September 20, 2003 || Palomar || NEAT || — || align=right | 4.3 km || 
|-id=223 bgcolor=#d6d6d6
| 128223 ||  || — || September 20, 2003 || Kitt Peak || Spacewatch || — || align=right | 6.0 km || 
|-id=224 bgcolor=#d6d6d6
| 128224 ||  || — || September 20, 2003 || Socorro || LINEAR || — || align=right | 9.1 km || 
|-id=225 bgcolor=#d6d6d6
| 128225 ||  || — || September 20, 2003 || Kitt Peak || Spacewatch || — || align=right | 7.5 km || 
|-id=226 bgcolor=#d6d6d6
| 128226 ||  || — || September 16, 2003 || Palomar || NEAT || HYG || align=right | 4.4 km || 
|-id=227 bgcolor=#fefefe
| 128227 ||  || — || September 16, 2003 || Socorro || LINEAR || — || align=right | 3.4 km || 
|-id=228 bgcolor=#E9E9E9
| 128228 Williammarsh ||  ||  || September 18, 2003 || Goodricke-Pigott || R. A. Tucker || WIT || align=right | 2.3 km || 
|-id=229 bgcolor=#d6d6d6
| 128229 ||  || — || September 19, 2003 || Socorro || LINEAR || — || align=right | 4.3 km || 
|-id=230 bgcolor=#d6d6d6
| 128230 ||  || — || September 19, 2003 || Haleakala || NEAT || CRO || align=right | 6.9 km || 
|-id=231 bgcolor=#d6d6d6
| 128231 ||  || — || September 19, 2003 || Palomar || NEAT || — || align=right | 7.1 km || 
|-id=232 bgcolor=#d6d6d6
| 128232 ||  || — || September 20, 2003 || Palomar || NEAT || EOS || align=right | 4.8 km || 
|-id=233 bgcolor=#d6d6d6
| 128233 ||  || — || September 16, 2003 || Socorro || LINEAR || — || align=right | 3.9 km || 
|-id=234 bgcolor=#d6d6d6
| 128234 ||  || — || September 16, 2003 || Kitt Peak || Spacewatch || — || align=right | 4.2 km || 
|-id=235 bgcolor=#d6d6d6
| 128235 ||  || — || September 17, 2003 || Socorro || LINEAR || 3:2 || align=right | 11 km || 
|-id=236 bgcolor=#d6d6d6
| 128236 ||  || — || September 17, 2003 || Socorro || LINEAR || EOS || align=right | 4.9 km || 
|-id=237 bgcolor=#d6d6d6
| 128237 ||  || — || September 18, 2003 || Kitt Peak || Spacewatch || THM || align=right | 5.0 km || 
|-id=238 bgcolor=#d6d6d6
| 128238 ||  || — || September 19, 2003 || Anderson Mesa || LONEOS || EOS || align=right | 3.7 km || 
|-id=239 bgcolor=#d6d6d6
| 128239 ||  || — || September 19, 2003 || Anderson Mesa || LONEOS || — || align=right | 7.4 km || 
|-id=240 bgcolor=#E9E9E9
| 128240 ||  || — || September 20, 2003 || Anderson Mesa || LONEOS || — || align=right | 3.7 km || 
|-id=241 bgcolor=#d6d6d6
| 128241 ||  || — || September 21, 2003 || Kitt Peak || Spacewatch || TEL || align=right | 2.7 km || 
|-id=242 bgcolor=#E9E9E9
| 128242 ||  || — || September 22, 2003 || Kleť || M. Tichý || — || align=right | 3.8 km || 
|-id=243 bgcolor=#d6d6d6
| 128243 ||  || — || September 18, 2003 || Socorro || LINEAR || 7:4 || align=right | 5.6 km || 
|-id=244 bgcolor=#d6d6d6
| 128244 ||  || — || September 18, 2003 || Palomar || NEAT || — || align=right | 6.0 km || 
|-id=245 bgcolor=#d6d6d6
| 128245 ||  || — || September 18, 2003 || Palomar || NEAT || — || align=right | 7.7 km || 
|-id=246 bgcolor=#d6d6d6
| 128246 ||  || — || September 18, 2003 || Palomar || NEAT || KOR || align=right | 2.5 km || 
|-id=247 bgcolor=#d6d6d6
| 128247 ||  || — || September 22, 2003 || Anderson Mesa || LONEOS || — || align=right | 4.9 km || 
|-id=248 bgcolor=#d6d6d6
| 128248 ||  || — || September 25, 2003 || Haleakala || NEAT || THM || align=right | 6.9 km || 
|-id=249 bgcolor=#d6d6d6
| 128249 ||  || — || September 26, 2003 || Socorro || LINEAR || KOR || align=right | 5.2 km || 
|-id=250 bgcolor=#d6d6d6
| 128250 ||  || — || September 27, 2003 || Anderson Mesa || LONEOS || — || align=right | 5.3 km || 
|-id=251 bgcolor=#d6d6d6
| 128251 ||  || — || September 26, 2003 || Socorro || LINEAR || EOS || align=right | 4.0 km || 
|-id=252 bgcolor=#d6d6d6
| 128252 ||  || — || September 26, 2003 || Socorro || LINEAR || KOR || align=right | 2.7 km || 
|-id=253 bgcolor=#d6d6d6
| 128253 ||  || — || September 28, 2003 || Kitt Peak || Spacewatch || — || align=right | 5.0 km || 
|-id=254 bgcolor=#d6d6d6
| 128254 ||  || — || September 28, 2003 || Kitt Peak || Spacewatch || SHU3:2 || align=right | 9.3 km || 
|-id=255 bgcolor=#d6d6d6
| 128255 ||  || — || September 24, 2003 || Haleakala || NEAT || — || align=right | 5.0 km || 
|-id=256 bgcolor=#d6d6d6
| 128256 ||  || — || September 20, 2003 || Socorro || LINEAR || VER || align=right | 5.1 km || 
|-id=257 bgcolor=#d6d6d6
| 128257 ||  || — || September 25, 2003 || Palomar || NEAT || — || align=right | 5.9 km || 
|-id=258 bgcolor=#E9E9E9
| 128258 ||  || — || September 18, 2003 || Haleakala || NEAT || HOF || align=right | 3.9 km || 
|-id=259 bgcolor=#d6d6d6
| 128259 ||  || — || September 18, 2003 || Haleakala || NEAT || Tj (2.95) || align=right | 8.6 km || 
|-id=260 bgcolor=#d6d6d6
| 128260 ||  || — || September 18, 2003 || Haleakala || NEAT || ALA || align=right | 6.0 km || 
|-id=261 bgcolor=#fefefe
| 128261 ||  || — || September 18, 2003 || Haleakala || NEAT || — || align=right | 1.3 km || 
|-id=262 bgcolor=#d6d6d6
| 128262 ||  || — || September 17, 2003 || Palomar || NEAT || KOR || align=right | 2.5 km || 
|-id=263 bgcolor=#E9E9E9
| 128263 ||  || — || September 17, 2003 || Palomar || NEAT || — || align=right | 5.7 km || 
|-id=264 bgcolor=#d6d6d6
| 128264 ||  || — || September 17, 2003 || Palomar || NEAT || — || align=right | 9.0 km || 
|-id=265 bgcolor=#d6d6d6
| 128265 ||  || — || September 17, 2003 || Palomar || NEAT || — || align=right | 7.4 km || 
|-id=266 bgcolor=#d6d6d6
| 128266 ||  || — || October 4, 2003 || Kingsnake || J. V. McClusky || — || align=right | 9.1 km || 
|-id=267 bgcolor=#d6d6d6
| 128267 ||  || — || October 1, 2003 || Anderson Mesa || LONEOS || CRO || align=right | 7.3 km || 
|-id=268 bgcolor=#d6d6d6
| 128268 ||  || — || October 1, 2003 || Anderson Mesa || LONEOS || — || align=right | 9.2 km || 
|-id=269 bgcolor=#d6d6d6
| 128269 ||  || — || October 5, 2003 || Socorro || LINEAR || — || align=right | 8.9 km || 
|-id=270 bgcolor=#d6d6d6
| 128270 ||  || — || October 3, 2003 || Haleakala || NEAT || — || align=right | 4.1 km || 
|-id=271 bgcolor=#d6d6d6
| 128271 ||  || — || October 16, 2003 || Kitt Peak || Spacewatch || — || align=right | 3.8 km || 
|-id=272 bgcolor=#E9E9E9
| 128272 ||  || — || October 17, 2003 || Kitt Peak || Spacewatch || — || align=right | 2.2 km || 
|-id=273 bgcolor=#fefefe
| 128273 ||  || — || October 18, 2003 || Palomar || NEAT || — || align=right | 3.2 km || 
|-id=274 bgcolor=#d6d6d6
| 128274 ||  || — || October 16, 2003 || Kitt Peak || Spacewatch || — || align=right | 5.7 km || 
|-id=275 bgcolor=#d6d6d6
| 128275 ||  || — || October 16, 2003 || Palomar || NEAT || — || align=right | 4.9 km || 
|-id=276 bgcolor=#E9E9E9
| 128276 ||  || — || October 17, 2003 || Kitt Peak || Spacewatch || — || align=right | 3.8 km || 
|-id=277 bgcolor=#E9E9E9
| 128277 ||  || — || October 18, 2003 || Palomar || NEAT || 526 || align=right | 5.4 km || 
|-id=278 bgcolor=#d6d6d6
| 128278 ||  || — || October 20, 2003 || Palomar || NEAT || — || align=right | 6.3 km || 
|-id=279 bgcolor=#d6d6d6
| 128279 ||  || — || October 21, 2003 || Socorro || LINEAR || — || align=right | 5.1 km || 
|-id=280 bgcolor=#d6d6d6
| 128280 ||  || — || October 16, 2003 || Palomar || NEAT || — || align=right | 6.4 km || 
|-id=281 bgcolor=#d6d6d6
| 128281 ||  || — || October 18, 2003 || Anderson Mesa || LONEOS || KOR || align=right | 2.8 km || 
|-id=282 bgcolor=#d6d6d6
| 128282 ||  || — || October 20, 2003 || Socorro || LINEAR || — || align=right | 3.8 km || 
|-id=283 bgcolor=#d6d6d6
| 128283 ||  || — || October 22, 2003 || Socorro || LINEAR || EOS || align=right | 4.6 km || 
|-id=284 bgcolor=#d6d6d6
| 128284 ||  || — || October 22, 2003 || Socorro || LINEAR || — || align=right | 5.9 km || 
|-id=285 bgcolor=#d6d6d6
| 128285 ||  || — || October 21, 2003 || Palomar || NEAT || — || align=right | 3.7 km || 
|-id=286 bgcolor=#d6d6d6
| 128286 ||  || — || October 22, 2003 || Palomar || NEAT || EOS || align=right | 4.3 km || 
|-id=287 bgcolor=#d6d6d6
| 128287 ||  || — || October 21, 2003 || Kitt Peak || Spacewatch || — || align=right | 4.6 km || 
|-id=288 bgcolor=#d6d6d6
| 128288 ||  || — || October 23, 2003 || Anderson Mesa || LONEOS || — || align=right | 4.5 km || 
|-id=289 bgcolor=#d6d6d6
| 128289 ||  || — || October 24, 2003 || Kitt Peak || Spacewatch || — || align=right | 4.1 km || 
|-id=290 bgcolor=#d6d6d6
| 128290 ||  || — || October 25, 2003 || Kitt Peak || Spacewatch || — || align=right | 5.2 km || 
|-id=291 bgcolor=#d6d6d6
| 128291 ||  || — || October 25, 2003 || Socorro || LINEAR || — || align=right | 9.5 km || 
|-id=292 bgcolor=#d6d6d6
| 128292 ||  || — || November 19, 2003 || Kitt Peak || Spacewatch || EMA || align=right | 7.2 km || 
|-id=293 bgcolor=#d6d6d6
| 128293 ||  || — || November 19, 2003 || Palomar || NEAT || EUP || align=right | 8.9 km || 
|-id=294 bgcolor=#d6d6d6
| 128294 ||  || — || November 19, 2003 || Anderson Mesa || LONEOS || KOR || align=right | 3.4 km || 
|-id=295 bgcolor=#d6d6d6
| 128295 ||  || — || November 20, 2003 || Socorro || LINEAR || 3:2 || align=right | 5.3 km || 
|-id=296 bgcolor=#d6d6d6
| 128296 ||  || — || November 26, 2003 || Anderson Mesa || LONEOS || — || align=right | 7.5 km || 
|-id=297 bgcolor=#d6d6d6
| 128297 Ashlevi ||  ||  || December 13, 2003 || Wrightwood || J. W. Young || KAR || align=right | 2.1 km || 
|-id=298 bgcolor=#E9E9E9
| 128298 ||  || — || December 4, 2003 || Socorro || LINEAR || MAR || align=right | 2.1 km || 
|-id=299 bgcolor=#C2FFFF
| 128299 ||  || — || December 19, 2003 || Socorro || LINEAR || L5 || align=right | 27 km || 
|-id=300 bgcolor=#E9E9E9
| 128300 ||  || — || December 18, 2003 || Socorro || LINEAR || — || align=right | 3.1 km || 
|}

128301–128400 

|-bgcolor=#C2FFFF
| 128301 ||  || — || December 28, 2003 || Socorro || LINEAR || L5 || align=right | 18 km || 
|-id=302 bgcolor=#fefefe
| 128302 ||  || — || January 15, 2004 || Sandlot || G. Hug || — || align=right | 1.2 km || 
|-id=303 bgcolor=#E9E9E9
| 128303 ||  || — || January 13, 2004 || Anderson Mesa || LONEOS || — || align=right | 5.4 km || 
|-id=304 bgcolor=#d6d6d6
| 128304 ||  || — || January 17, 2004 || Haleakala || NEAT || — || align=right | 3.7 km || 
|-id=305 bgcolor=#d6d6d6
| 128305 ||  || — || January 21, 2004 || Socorro || LINEAR || EOS || align=right | 5.4 km || 
|-id=306 bgcolor=#fefefe
| 128306 ||  || — || January 22, 2004 || Socorro || LINEAR || NYS || align=right | 1.3 km || 
|-id=307 bgcolor=#fefefe
| 128307 ||  || — || January 23, 2004 || Anderson Mesa || LONEOS || — || align=right | 1.7 km || 
|-id=308 bgcolor=#E9E9E9
| 128308 ||  || — || January 23, 2004 || Socorro || LINEAR || — || align=right | 2.7 km || 
|-id=309 bgcolor=#E9E9E9
| 128309 ||  || — || January 28, 2004 || Socorro || LINEAR || — || align=right | 2.0 km || 
|-id=310 bgcolor=#fefefe
| 128310 ||  || — || January 29, 2004 || Anderson Mesa || LONEOS || — || align=right | 1.6 km || 
|-id=311 bgcolor=#d6d6d6
| 128311 ||  || — || February 11, 2004 || Palomar || NEAT || — || align=right | 7.8 km || 
|-id=312 bgcolor=#d6d6d6
| 128312 ||  || — || February 11, 2004 || Kitt Peak || Spacewatch || — || align=right | 4.9 km || 
|-id=313 bgcolor=#d6d6d6
| 128313 ||  || — || February 12, 2004 || Palomar || NEAT || 7:4 || align=right | 6.3 km || 
|-id=314 bgcolor=#fefefe
| 128314 Coraliejackman ||  ||  || February 15, 2004 || Catalina || CSS || — || align=right | 4.2 km || 
|-id=315 bgcolor=#fefefe
| 128315 Dereknelson ||  ||  || February 17, 2004 || Catalina || CSS || FLO || align=right | 1.6 km || 
|-id=316 bgcolor=#fefefe
| 128316 ||  || — || February 19, 2004 || Socorro || LINEAR || — || align=right | 1.3 km || 
|-id=317 bgcolor=#d6d6d6
| 128317 ||  || — || February 17, 2004 || Kitt Peak || Spacewatch || — || align=right | 5.6 km || 
|-id=318 bgcolor=#fefefe
| 128318 ||  || — || March 14, 2004 || Socorro || LINEAR || — || align=right | 2.1 km || 
|-id=319 bgcolor=#fefefe
| 128319 ||  || — || March 15, 2004 || Socorro || LINEAR || FLO || align=right | 1.8 km || 
|-id=320 bgcolor=#d6d6d6
| 128320 ||  || — || March 13, 2004 || Palomar || NEAT || — || align=right | 4.2 km || 
|-id=321 bgcolor=#fefefe
| 128321 Philipdumont ||  ||  || March 15, 2004 || Catalina || CSS || NYS || align=right | 1.2 km || 
|-id=322 bgcolor=#fefefe
| 128322 ||  || — || March 15, 2004 || Palomar || NEAT || — || align=right | 1.5 km || 
|-id=323 bgcolor=#fefefe
| 128323 Peterwolff ||  ||  || March 15, 2004 || Catalina || CSS || — || align=right | 1.2 km || 
|-id=324 bgcolor=#fefefe
| 128324 ||  || — || March 15, 2004 || Kitt Peak || Spacewatch || — || align=right | 1.3 km || 
|-id=325 bgcolor=#d6d6d6
| 128325 ||  || — || March 14, 2004 || Kitt Peak || Spacewatch || — || align=right | 4.0 km || 
|-id=326 bgcolor=#fefefe
| 128326 || 2004 FN || — || March 16, 2004 || Socorro || LINEAR || H || align=right | 1.1 km || 
|-id=327 bgcolor=#fefefe
| 128327 Ericcarranza ||  ||  || March 16, 2004 || Catalina || CSS || H || align=right data-sort-value="0.84" | 840 m || 
|-id=328 bgcolor=#fefefe
| 128328 ||  || — || March 20, 2004 || Siding Spring || SSS || H || align=right data-sort-value="0.95" | 950 m || 
|-id=329 bgcolor=#fefefe
| 128329 ||  || — || March 16, 2004 || Kitt Peak || Spacewatch || V || align=right data-sort-value="0.94" | 940 m || 
|-id=330 bgcolor=#fefefe
| 128330 ||  || — || March 17, 2004 || Kitt Peak || Spacewatch || NYS || align=right | 1.7 km || 
|-id=331 bgcolor=#fefefe
| 128331 ||  || — || March 17, 2004 || Socorro || LINEAR || — || align=right data-sort-value="0.91" | 910 m || 
|-id=332 bgcolor=#fefefe
| 128332 ||  || — || March 18, 2004 || Socorro || LINEAR || — || align=right | 1.7 km || 
|-id=333 bgcolor=#d6d6d6
| 128333 ||  || — || March 19, 2004 || Socorro || LINEAR || KAR || align=right | 2.1 km || 
|-id=334 bgcolor=#fefefe
| 128334 ||  || — || March 19, 2004 || Socorro || LINEAR || FLO || align=right | 1.2 km || 
|-id=335 bgcolor=#E9E9E9
| 128335 ||  || — || March 20, 2004 || Socorro || LINEAR || — || align=right | 2.6 km || 
|-id=336 bgcolor=#fefefe
| 128336 ||  || — || March 20, 2004 || Socorro || LINEAR || FLO || align=right | 1.3 km || 
|-id=337 bgcolor=#fefefe
| 128337 ||  || — || March 25, 2004 || Anderson Mesa || LONEOS || — || align=right | 1.5 km || 
|-id=338 bgcolor=#fefefe
| 128338 ||  || — || March 26, 2004 || Socorro || LINEAR || EUT || align=right | 1.4 km || 
|-id=339 bgcolor=#fefefe
| 128339 ||  || — || March 22, 2004 || Socorro || LINEAR || FLO || align=right | 1.5 km || 
|-id=340 bgcolor=#E9E9E9
| 128340 ||  || — || March 23, 2004 || Socorro || LINEAR || — || align=right | 3.6 km || 
|-id=341 bgcolor=#fefefe
| 128341 Dalestanbridge ||  ||  || March 27, 2004 || Catalina || CSS || H || align=right | 1.5 km || 
|-id=342 bgcolor=#E9E9E9
| 128342 ||  || — || March 17, 2004 || Kitt Peak || Spacewatch || — || align=right | 2.2 km || 
|-id=343 bgcolor=#E9E9E9
| 128343 Brianpage ||  ||  || April 11, 2004 || Catalina || CSS || — || align=right | 2.5 km || 
|-id=344 bgcolor=#fefefe
| 128344 ||  || — || April 12, 2004 || Anderson Mesa || LONEOS || — || align=right | 1.2 km || 
|-id=345 bgcolor=#E9E9E9
| 128345 Danielbamberger ||  ||  || April 15, 2004 || Emerald Lane || L. Ball || — || align=right | 2.2 km || 
|-id=346 bgcolor=#fefefe
| 128346 ||  || — || April 15, 2004 || Palomar || NEAT || H || align=right | 1.9 km || 
|-id=347 bgcolor=#fefefe
| 128347 ||  || — || April 12, 2004 || Kitt Peak || Spacewatch || — || align=right | 1.2 km || 
|-id=348 bgcolor=#E9E9E9
| 128348 Jasonleonard ||  ||  || April 15, 2004 || Catalina || CSS || — || align=right | 2.2 km || 
|-id=349 bgcolor=#fefefe
| 128349 ||  || — || April 12, 2004 || Anderson Mesa || LONEOS || — || align=right | 3.0 km || 
|-id=350 bgcolor=#fefefe
| 128350 ||  || — || April 13, 2004 || Palomar || NEAT || — || align=right | 2.9 km || 
|-id=351 bgcolor=#fefefe
| 128351 ||  || — || April 13, 2004 || Kitt Peak || Spacewatch || — || align=right data-sort-value="0.91" | 910 m || 
|-id=352 bgcolor=#fefefe
| 128352 ||  || — || April 14, 2004 || Palomar || NEAT || FLO || align=right | 1.6 km || 
|-id=353 bgcolor=#FA8072
| 128353 ||  || — || April 15, 2004 || Anderson Mesa || LONEOS || — || align=right | 1.8 km || 
|-id=354 bgcolor=#E9E9E9
| 128354 ||  || — || April 14, 2004 || Kitt Peak || Spacewatch || — || align=right | 2.3 km || 
|-id=355 bgcolor=#fefefe
| 128355 ||  || — || April 13, 2004 || Kitt Peak || Spacewatch || MAS || align=right data-sort-value="0.94" | 940 m || 
|-id=356 bgcolor=#fefefe
| 128356 ||  || — || April 15, 2004 || Kitt Peak || Spacewatch || — || align=right | 1.5 km || 
|-id=357 bgcolor=#E9E9E9
| 128357 ||  || — || April 16, 2004 || Anderson Mesa || LONEOS || EUN || align=right | 2.0 km || 
|-id=358 bgcolor=#fefefe
| 128358 ||  || — || April 16, 2004 || Socorro || LINEAR || — || align=right | 1.4 km || 
|-id=359 bgcolor=#fefefe
| 128359 ||  || — || April 16, 2004 || Socorro || LINEAR || — || align=right | 2.8 km || 
|-id=360 bgcolor=#E9E9E9
| 128360 ||  || — || April 17, 2004 || Socorro || LINEAR || — || align=right | 2.0 km || 
|-id=361 bgcolor=#fefefe
| 128361 ||  || — || April 17, 2004 || Palomar || NEAT || FLO || align=right | 1.4 km || 
|-id=362 bgcolor=#fefefe
| 128362 ||  || — || April 20, 2004 || Kitt Peak || Spacewatch || — || align=right | 1.6 km || 
|-id=363 bgcolor=#fefefe
| 128363 ||  || — || April 20, 2004 || Socorro || LINEAR || — || align=right | 1.4 km || 
|-id=364 bgcolor=#fefefe
| 128364 ||  || — || April 21, 2004 || Kitt Peak || Spacewatch || FLO || align=right | 1.3 km || 
|-id=365 bgcolor=#fefefe
| 128365 ||  || — || April 21, 2004 || Socorro || LINEAR || — || align=right | 1.4 km || 
|-id=366 bgcolor=#fefefe
| 128366 ||  || — || April 21, 2004 || Socorro || LINEAR || — || align=right data-sort-value="0.94" | 940 m || 
|-id=367 bgcolor=#fefefe
| 128367 ||  || — || April 25, 2004 || Kitt Peak || Spacewatch || — || align=right | 2.8 km || 
|-id=368 bgcolor=#fefefe
| 128368 ||  || — || April 25, 2004 || Socorro || LINEAR || FLO || align=right | 1.00 km || 
|-id=369 bgcolor=#d6d6d6
| 128369 ||  || — || April 30, 2004 || Kitt Peak || Spacewatch || — || align=right | 4.0 km || 
|-id=370 bgcolor=#E9E9E9
| 128370 ||  || — || April 25, 2004 || Kitt Peak || Spacewatch || — || align=right | 1.7 km || 
|-id=371 bgcolor=#d6d6d6
| 128371 ||  || — || April 30, 2004 || Kitt Peak || Spacewatch || — || align=right | 3.7 km || 
|-id=372 bgcolor=#fefefe
| 128372 Danielwibben ||  ||  || May 9, 2004 || Catalina || CSS || H || align=right | 1.1 km || 
|-id=373 bgcolor=#d6d6d6
| 128373 Kevinjohnson ||  ||  || May 12, 2004 || Catalina || CSS || — || align=right | 3.5 km || 
|-id=374 bgcolor=#fefefe
| 128374 ||  || — || May 15, 2004 || Socorro || LINEAR || — || align=right | 1.0 km || 
|-id=375 bgcolor=#fefefe
| 128375 ||  || — || May 15, 2004 || Socorro || LINEAR || — || align=right | 1.6 km || 
|-id=376 bgcolor=#fefefe
| 128376 ||  || — || May 15, 2004 || Socorro || LINEAR || NYS || align=right | 1.1 km || 
|-id=377 bgcolor=#d6d6d6
| 128377 ||  || — || May 12, 2004 || Siding Spring || SSS || THM || align=right | 3.8 km || 
|-id=378 bgcolor=#fefefe
| 128378 ||  || — || May 15, 2004 || Socorro || LINEAR || — || align=right | 3.3 km || 
|-id=379 bgcolor=#fefefe
| 128379 ||  || — || May 15, 2004 || Socorro || LINEAR || — || align=right | 1.0 km || 
|-id=380 bgcolor=#fefefe
| 128380 ||  || — || May 15, 2004 || Socorro || LINEAR || — || align=right | 1.7 km || 
|-id=381 bgcolor=#E9E9E9
| 128381 ||  || — || May 15, 2004 || Socorro || LINEAR || GEF || align=right | 2.0 km || 
|-id=382 bgcolor=#fefefe
| 128382 ||  || — || May 15, 2004 || Socorro || LINEAR || — || align=right | 1.3 km || 
|-id=383 bgcolor=#C2FFFF
| 128383 ||  || — || May 9, 2004 || Kitt Peak || Spacewatch || L4 || align=right | 13 km || 
|-id=384 bgcolor=#fefefe
| 128384 ||  || — || May 16, 2004 || Socorro || LINEAR || V || align=right | 1.2 km || 
|-id=385 bgcolor=#E9E9E9
| 128385 ||  || — || May 16, 2004 || Socorro || LINEAR || — || align=right | 2.1 km || 
|-id=386 bgcolor=#fefefe
| 128386 ||  || — || May 16, 2004 || Socorro || LINEAR || — || align=right | 1.3 km || 
|-id=387 bgcolor=#E9E9E9
| 128387 ||  || — || May 16, 2004 || Socorro || LINEAR || — || align=right | 4.2 km || 
|-id=388 bgcolor=#fefefe
| 128388 ||  || — || May 23, 2004 || Socorro || LINEAR || H || align=right | 1.5 km || 
|-id=389 bgcolor=#d6d6d6
| 128389 Dougleland ||  ||  || May 22, 2004 || Catalina || CSS || URS || align=right | 5.9 km || 
|-id=390 bgcolor=#E9E9E9
| 128390 ||  || — || May 23, 2004 || Kitt Peak || Spacewatch || — || align=right | 4.5 km || 
|-id=391 bgcolor=#fefefe
| 128391 || 2004 LQ || — || June 8, 2004 || Palomar || NEAT || PHO || align=right | 2.7 km || 
|-id=392 bgcolor=#d6d6d6
| 128392 || 2004 LY || — || June 9, 2004 || Anderson Mesa || LONEOS || — || align=right | 6.9 km || 
|-id=393 bgcolor=#fefefe
| 128393 ||  || — || June 6, 2004 || Palomar || NEAT || — || align=right | 1.2 km || 
|-id=394 bgcolor=#E9E9E9
| 128394 ||  || — || June 6, 2004 || Palomar || NEAT || KON || align=right | 5.0 km || 
|-id=395 bgcolor=#E9E9E9
| 128395 ||  || — || June 12, 2004 || Socorro || LINEAR || — || align=right | 5.4 km || 
|-id=396 bgcolor=#fefefe
| 128396 ||  || — || June 12, 2004 || Palomar || NEAT || — || align=right | 1.8 km || 
|-id=397 bgcolor=#d6d6d6
| 128397 ||  || — || June 6, 2004 || Palomar || NEAT || — || align=right | 4.6 km || 
|-id=398 bgcolor=#fefefe
| 128398 ||  || — || June 11, 2004 || Socorro || LINEAR || NYS || align=right | 1.1 km || 
|-id=399 bgcolor=#E9E9E9
| 128399 ||  || — || June 11, 2004 || Palomar || NEAT || — || align=right | 4.3 km || 
|-id=400 bgcolor=#fefefe
| 128400 ||  || — || June 11, 2004 || Socorro || LINEAR || — || align=right | 2.9 km || 
|}

128401–128500 

|-bgcolor=#E9E9E9
| 128401 ||  || — || June 13, 2004 || Palomar || NEAT || MIS || align=right | 4.3 km || 
|-id=402 bgcolor=#fefefe
| 128402 ||  || — || June 13, 2004 || Palomar || NEAT || NYS || align=right | 1.2 km || 
|-id=403 bgcolor=#fefefe
| 128403 ||  || — || June 8, 2004 || Kitt Peak || Spacewatch || V || align=right data-sort-value="0.94" | 940 m || 
|-id=404 bgcolor=#E9E9E9
| 128404 ||  || — || June 11, 2004 || Socorro || LINEAR || — || align=right | 2.8 km || 
|-id=405 bgcolor=#E9E9E9
| 128405 ||  || — || June 11, 2004 || Socorro || LINEAR || — || align=right | 3.6 km || 
|-id=406 bgcolor=#fefefe
| 128406 ||  || — || June 11, 2004 || Socorro || LINEAR || — || align=right | 1.9 km || 
|-id=407 bgcolor=#d6d6d6
| 128407 ||  || — || June 12, 2004 || Socorro || LINEAR || — || align=right | 4.0 km || 
|-id=408 bgcolor=#fefefe
| 128408 Mikehughes ||  ||  || June 12, 2004 || Catalina || CSS || — || align=right | 2.2 km || 
|-id=409 bgcolor=#fefefe
| 128409 ||  || — || June 12, 2004 || Palomar || NEAT || CHL || align=right | 3.8 km || 
|-id=410 bgcolor=#fefefe
| 128410 ||  || — || June 12, 2004 || Palomar || NEAT || NYS || align=right | 3.0 km || 
|-id=411 bgcolor=#E9E9E9
| 128411 ||  || — || June 12, 2004 || Siding Spring || SSS || — || align=right | 2.2 km || 
|-id=412 bgcolor=#d6d6d6
| 128412 ||  || — || June 14, 2004 || Socorro || LINEAR || LIX || align=right | 8.6 km || 
|-id=413 bgcolor=#fefefe
| 128413 ||  || — || June 14, 2004 || Socorro || LINEAR || — || align=right | 4.6 km || 
|-id=414 bgcolor=#E9E9E9
| 128414 ||  || — || June 12, 2004 || Socorro || LINEAR || — || align=right | 6.3 km || 
|-id=415 bgcolor=#E9E9E9
| 128415 ||  || — || June 13, 2004 || Socorro || LINEAR || EUN || align=right | 2.8 km || 
|-id=416 bgcolor=#d6d6d6
| 128416 ||  || — || June 13, 2004 || Socorro || LINEAR || — || align=right | 5.0 km || 
|-id=417 bgcolor=#d6d6d6
| 128417 Chrismccaa ||  ||  || June 12, 2004 || Catalina || CSS || — || align=right | 5.9 km || 
|-id=418 bgcolor=#d6d6d6
| 128418 ||  || — || June 12, 2004 || Anderson Mesa || LONEOS || EUP || align=right | 7.2 km || 
|-id=419 bgcolor=#fefefe
| 128419 ||  || — || June 14, 2004 || Kitt Peak || Spacewatch || — || align=right | 3.1 km || 
|-id=420 bgcolor=#d6d6d6
| 128420 || 2004 MS || — || June 16, 2004 || Socorro || LINEAR || 3:2 || align=right | 9.0 km || 
|-id=421 bgcolor=#E9E9E9
| 128421 ||  || — || June 16, 2004 || Socorro || LINEAR || — || align=right | 2.1 km || 
|-id=422 bgcolor=#E9E9E9
| 128422 ||  || — || June 16, 2004 || Socorro || LINEAR || MAR || align=right | 3.7 km || 
|-id=423 bgcolor=#fefefe
| 128423 ||  || — || June 16, 2004 || Socorro || LINEAR || KLI || align=right | 5.3 km || 
|-id=424 bgcolor=#fefefe
| 128424 ||  || — || June 17, 2004 || Socorro || LINEAR || H || align=right | 1.4 km || 
|-id=425 bgcolor=#d6d6d6
| 128425 ||  || — || June 20, 2004 || Kitt Peak || Spacewatch || — || align=right | 4.7 km || 
|-id=426 bgcolor=#fefefe
| 128426 Vekerdi ||  ||  || June 18, 2004 || Piszkéstető || K. Sárneczky || V || align=right data-sort-value="0.89" | 890 m || 
|-id=427 bgcolor=#E9E9E9
| 128427 ||  || — || June 28, 2004 || Reedy Creek || J. Broughton || — || align=right | 2.1 km || 
|-id=428 bgcolor=#fefefe
| 128428 || 2004 NJ || — || July 8, 2004 || Reedy Creek || J. Broughton || MAS || align=right | 1.4 km || 
|-id=429 bgcolor=#E9E9E9
| 128429 || 2004 NK || — || July 8, 2004 || Reedy Creek || J. Broughton || — || align=right | 2.5 km || 
|-id=430 bgcolor=#d6d6d6
| 128430 ||  || — || July 7, 2004 || Campo Imperatore || CINEOS || — || align=right | 3.9 km || 
|-id=431 bgcolor=#E9E9E9
| 128431 ||  || — || July 9, 2004 || Socorro || LINEAR || — || align=right | 1.8 km || 
|-id=432 bgcolor=#fefefe
| 128432 ||  || — || July 9, 2004 || Palomar || NEAT || V || align=right | 1.2 km || 
|-id=433 bgcolor=#d6d6d6
| 128433 ||  || — || July 9, 2004 || Palomar || NEAT || — || align=right | 3.0 km || 
|-id=434 bgcolor=#fefefe
| 128434 ||  || — || July 9, 2004 || Siding Spring || SSS || — || align=right | 2.6 km || 
|-id=435 bgcolor=#d6d6d6
| 128435 ||  || — || July 13, 2004 || Palomar || NEAT || — || align=right | 6.2 km || 
|-id=436 bgcolor=#d6d6d6
| 128436 ||  || — || July 11, 2004 || Palomar || NEAT || — || align=right | 3.8 km || 
|-id=437 bgcolor=#fefefe
| 128437 ||  || — || July 14, 2004 || Socorro || LINEAR || H || align=right | 1.6 km || 
|-id=438 bgcolor=#d6d6d6
| 128438 ||  || — || July 9, 2004 || Socorro || LINEAR || — || align=right | 6.8 km || 
|-id=439 bgcolor=#fefefe
| 128439 Chriswaters ||  ||  || July 10, 2004 || Catalina || CSS || V || align=right data-sort-value="0.98" | 980 m || 
|-id=440 bgcolor=#d6d6d6
| 128440 ||  || — || July 11, 2004 || Socorro || LINEAR || — || align=right | 5.2 km || 
|-id=441 bgcolor=#E9E9E9
| 128441 ||  || — || July 11, 2004 || Socorro || LINEAR || — || align=right | 2.2 km || 
|-id=442 bgcolor=#d6d6d6
| 128442 ||  || — || July 11, 2004 || Socorro || LINEAR || — || align=right | 5.8 km || 
|-id=443 bgcolor=#d6d6d6
| 128443 ||  || — || July 11, 2004 || Socorro || LINEAR || — || align=right | 6.0 km || 
|-id=444 bgcolor=#E9E9E9
| 128444 ||  || — || July 11, 2004 || Socorro || LINEAR || — || align=right | 1.9 km || 
|-id=445 bgcolor=#fefefe
| 128445 ||  || — || July 14, 2004 || Socorro || LINEAR || — || align=right | 2.1 km || 
|-id=446 bgcolor=#fefefe
| 128446 ||  || — || July 15, 2004 || Socorro || LINEAR || NYS || align=right | 1.4 km || 
|-id=447 bgcolor=#fefefe
| 128447 ||  || — || July 15, 2004 || Socorro || LINEAR || — || align=right | 1.6 km || 
|-id=448 bgcolor=#d6d6d6
| 128448 ||  || — || July 14, 2004 || Socorro || LINEAR || ALA || align=right | 7.6 km || 
|-id=449 bgcolor=#d6d6d6
| 128449 ||  || — || July 14, 2004 || Socorro || LINEAR || — || align=right | 5.9 km || 
|-id=450 bgcolor=#fefefe
| 128450 ||  || — || July 15, 2004 || Socorro || LINEAR || — || align=right | 2.2 km || 
|-id=451 bgcolor=#FA8072
| 128451 ||  || — || July 15, 2004 || Socorro || LINEAR || — || align=right | 1.8 km || 
|-id=452 bgcolor=#fefefe
| 128452 ||  || — || July 15, 2004 || Socorro || LINEAR || FLO || align=right | 1.1 km || 
|-id=453 bgcolor=#d6d6d6
| 128453 ||  || — || July 11, 2004 || Socorro || LINEAR || — || align=right | 3.6 km || 
|-id=454 bgcolor=#d6d6d6
| 128454 ||  || — || July 11, 2004 || Socorro || LINEAR || ALA || align=right | 6.1 km || 
|-id=455 bgcolor=#fefefe
| 128455 ||  || — || July 11, 2004 || Socorro || LINEAR || V || align=right | 1.2 km || 
|-id=456 bgcolor=#fefefe
| 128456 ||  || — || July 11, 2004 || Socorro || LINEAR || — || align=right | 1.2 km || 
|-id=457 bgcolor=#E9E9E9
| 128457 ||  || — || July 14, 2004 || Socorro || LINEAR || MAR || align=right | 1.8 km || 
|-id=458 bgcolor=#E9E9E9
| 128458 ||  || — || July 14, 2004 || Socorro || LINEAR || — || align=right | 4.3 km || 
|-id=459 bgcolor=#E9E9E9
| 128459 ||  || — || July 14, 2004 || Socorro || LINEAR || WIT || align=right | 1.6 km || 
|-id=460 bgcolor=#d6d6d6
| 128460 ||  || — || July 15, 2004 || Siding Spring || SSS || — || align=right | 4.3 km || 
|-id=461 bgcolor=#fefefe
| 128461 || 2004 OA || — || July 16, 2004 || Pla D'Arguines || R. Ferrando || — || align=right | 3.0 km || 
|-id=462 bgcolor=#d6d6d6
| 128462 ||  || — || July 16, 2004 || Socorro || LINEAR || — || align=right | 3.4 km || 
|-id=463 bgcolor=#E9E9E9
| 128463 ||  || — || July 16, 2004 || Socorro || LINEAR || PAD || align=right | 3.0 km || 
|-id=464 bgcolor=#d6d6d6
| 128464 ||  || — || July 16, 2004 || Socorro || LINEAR || — || align=right | 5.9 km || 
|-id=465 bgcolor=#d6d6d6
| 128465 ||  || — || July 20, 2004 || Great Shefford || P. Birtwhistle || KOR || align=right | 2.3 km || 
|-id=466 bgcolor=#E9E9E9
| 128466 ||  || — || July 21, 2004 || Reedy Creek || J. Broughton || — || align=right | 3.9 km || 
|-id=467 bgcolor=#E9E9E9
| 128467 ||  || — || July 25, 2004 || Anderson Mesa || LONEOS || DOR || align=right | 4.4 km || 
|-id=468 bgcolor=#d6d6d6
| 128468 ||  || — || July 25, 2004 || Anderson Mesa || LONEOS || — || align=right | 2.8 km || 
|-id=469 bgcolor=#d6d6d6
| 128469 ||  || — || July 28, 2004 || Bergisch Gladbach || W. Bickel || THM || align=right | 3.1 km || 
|-id=470 bgcolor=#d6d6d6
| 128470 ||  || — || July 28, 2004 || Reedy Creek || J. Broughton || HYG || align=right | 4.5 km || 
|-id=471 bgcolor=#fefefe
| 128471 ||  || — || July 16, 2004 || Campo Imperatore || CINEOS || V || align=right | 1.2 km || 
|-id=472 bgcolor=#FA8072
| 128472 || 2004 PS || — || August 7, 2004 || Palomar || NEAT || — || align=right | 1.7 km || 
|-id=473 bgcolor=#E9E9E9
| 128473 || 2004 PV || — || August 6, 2004 || Palomar || NEAT || — || align=right | 2.1 km || 
|-id=474 bgcolor=#d6d6d6
| 128474 Arbacia ||  ||  || August 7, 2004 || Pla D'Arguines || R. Ferrando || — || align=right | 4.9 km || 
|-id=475 bgcolor=#d6d6d6
| 128475 ||  || — || August 6, 2004 || Reedy Creek || J. Broughton || — || align=right | 4.2 km || 
|-id=476 bgcolor=#d6d6d6
| 128476 ||  || — || August 3, 2004 || Siding Spring || SSS || EOS || align=right | 6.0 km || 
|-id=477 bgcolor=#d6d6d6
| 128477 ||  || — || August 3, 2004 || Siding Spring || SSS || EOS || align=right | 3.7 km || 
|-id=478 bgcolor=#d6d6d6
| 128478 ||  || — || August 3, 2004 || Siding Spring || SSS || — || align=right | 6.8 km || 
|-id=479 bgcolor=#fefefe
| 128479 ||  || — || August 4, 2004 || Palomar || NEAT || — || align=right | 4.6 km || 
|-id=480 bgcolor=#E9E9E9
| 128480 ||  || — || August 5, 2004 || Palomar || NEAT || — || align=right | 2.1 km || 
|-id=481 bgcolor=#E9E9E9
| 128481 ||  || — || August 6, 2004 || Palomar || NEAT || — || align=right | 1.7 km || 
|-id=482 bgcolor=#d6d6d6
| 128482 ||  || — || August 6, 2004 || Palomar || NEAT || — || align=right | 5.4 km || 
|-id=483 bgcolor=#fefefe
| 128483 ||  || — || August 6, 2004 || Palomar || NEAT || NYS || align=right data-sort-value="0.97" | 970 m || 
|-id=484 bgcolor=#E9E9E9
| 128484 ||  || — || August 6, 2004 || Campo Imperatore || CINEOS || — || align=right | 2.1 km || 
|-id=485 bgcolor=#fefefe
| 128485 ||  || — || August 6, 2004 || Campo Imperatore || CINEOS || FLO || align=right data-sort-value="0.90" | 900 m || 
|-id=486 bgcolor=#fefefe
| 128486 ||  || — || August 7, 2004 || Palomar || NEAT || NYS || align=right | 1.4 km || 
|-id=487 bgcolor=#E9E9E9
| 128487 ||  || — || August 7, 2004 || Palomar || NEAT || — || align=right | 1.5 km || 
|-id=488 bgcolor=#d6d6d6
| 128488 ||  || — || August 7, 2004 || Palomar || NEAT || — || align=right | 4.1 km || 
|-id=489 bgcolor=#fefefe
| 128489 ||  || — || August 7, 2004 || Palomar || NEAT || MAS || align=right | 1.6 km || 
|-id=490 bgcolor=#d6d6d6
| 128490 ||  || — || August 7, 2004 || Palomar || NEAT || EUP || align=right | 6.3 km || 
|-id=491 bgcolor=#fefefe
| 128491 ||  || — || August 7, 2004 || Palomar || NEAT || NYS || align=right data-sort-value="0.90" | 900 m || 
|-id=492 bgcolor=#d6d6d6
| 128492 ||  || — || August 7, 2004 || Palomar || NEAT || EOS || align=right | 4.6 km || 
|-id=493 bgcolor=#E9E9E9
| 128493 ||  || — || August 7, 2004 || Palomar || NEAT || — || align=right | 2.5 km || 
|-id=494 bgcolor=#fefefe
| 128494 ||  || — || August 7, 2004 || Palomar || NEAT || FLO || align=right | 1.3 km || 
|-id=495 bgcolor=#d6d6d6
| 128495 ||  || — || August 7, 2004 || Palomar || NEAT || HYG || align=right | 6.3 km || 
|-id=496 bgcolor=#fefefe
| 128496 ||  || — || August 7, 2004 || Campo Imperatore || CINEOS || — || align=right data-sort-value="0.96" | 960 m || 
|-id=497 bgcolor=#d6d6d6
| 128497 ||  || — || August 7, 2004 || Campo Imperatore || CINEOS || — || align=right | 5.5 km || 
|-id=498 bgcolor=#fefefe
| 128498 ||  || — || August 8, 2004 || Campo Imperatore || CINEOS || — || align=right | 1.7 km || 
|-id=499 bgcolor=#d6d6d6
| 128499 ||  || — || August 8, 2004 || Campo Imperatore || CINEOS || KOR || align=right | 2.3 km || 
|-id=500 bgcolor=#E9E9E9
| 128500 ||  || — || August 8, 2004 || Campo Imperatore || CINEOS || HEN || align=right | 3.6 km || 
|}

128501–128600 

|-bgcolor=#d6d6d6
| 128501 ||  || — || August 8, 2004 || Socorro || LINEAR || — || align=right | 6.1 km || 
|-id=502 bgcolor=#fefefe
| 128502 ||  || — || August 8, 2004 || Anderson Mesa || LONEOS || — || align=right | 2.8 km || 
|-id=503 bgcolor=#d6d6d6
| 128503 ||  || — || August 8, 2004 || Anderson Mesa || LONEOS || — || align=right | 7.0 km || 
|-id=504 bgcolor=#fefefe
| 128504 ||  || — || August 8, 2004 || Anderson Mesa || LONEOS || — || align=right | 1.3 km || 
|-id=505 bgcolor=#fefefe
| 128505 ||  || — || August 8, 2004 || Anderson Mesa || LONEOS || V || align=right | 1.4 km || 
|-id=506 bgcolor=#d6d6d6
| 128506 ||  || — || August 8, 2004 || Campo Imperatore || CINEOS || — || align=right | 3.7 km || 
|-id=507 bgcolor=#E9E9E9
| 128507 ||  || — || August 8, 2004 || Socorro || LINEAR || — || align=right | 4.3 km || 
|-id=508 bgcolor=#fefefe
| 128508 ||  || — || August 8, 2004 || Socorro || LINEAR || — || align=right | 1.4 km || 
|-id=509 bgcolor=#d6d6d6
| 128509 ||  || — || August 8, 2004 || Anderson Mesa || LONEOS || — || align=right | 5.1 km || 
|-id=510 bgcolor=#fefefe
| 128510 ||  || — || August 8, 2004 || Palomar || NEAT || — || align=right | 1.4 km || 
|-id=511 bgcolor=#d6d6d6
| 128511 ||  || — || August 9, 2004 || Anderson Mesa || LONEOS || — || align=right | 3.9 km || 
|-id=512 bgcolor=#fefefe
| 128512 ||  || — || August 9, 2004 || Socorro || LINEAR || NYS || align=right | 1.2 km || 
|-id=513 bgcolor=#E9E9E9
| 128513 ||  || — || August 9, 2004 || Socorro || LINEAR || DOR || align=right | 5.8 km || 
|-id=514 bgcolor=#d6d6d6
| 128514 ||  || — || August 9, 2004 || Socorro || LINEAR || — || align=right | 5.6 km || 
|-id=515 bgcolor=#fefefe
| 128515 ||  || — || August 9, 2004 || Socorro || LINEAR || — || align=right | 1.1 km || 
|-id=516 bgcolor=#d6d6d6
| 128516 ||  || — || August 9, 2004 || Socorro || LINEAR || THM || align=right | 2.9 km || 
|-id=517 bgcolor=#E9E9E9
| 128517 ||  || — || August 9, 2004 || Anderson Mesa || LONEOS || — || align=right | 2.0 km || 
|-id=518 bgcolor=#fefefe
| 128518 ||  || — || August 9, 2004 || Anderson Mesa || LONEOS || — || align=right | 1.3 km || 
|-id=519 bgcolor=#fefefe
| 128519 ||  || — || August 9, 2004 || Socorro || LINEAR || V || align=right | 1.1 km || 
|-id=520 bgcolor=#fefefe
| 128520 ||  || — || August 9, 2004 || Socorro || LINEAR || NYS || align=right | 1.3 km || 
|-id=521 bgcolor=#fefefe
| 128521 ||  || — || August 9, 2004 || Socorro || LINEAR || FLO || align=right data-sort-value="0.92" | 920 m || 
|-id=522 bgcolor=#d6d6d6
| 128522 ||  || — || August 9, 2004 || Socorro || LINEAR || TIR || align=right | 5.3 km || 
|-id=523 bgcolor=#fefefe
| 128523 Johnmuir ||  ||  || August 11, 2004 || Francisquito || R. E. Jones || NYS || align=right data-sort-value="0.96" | 960 m || 
|-id=524 bgcolor=#d6d6d6
| 128524 ||  || — || August 6, 2004 || Palomar || NEAT || — || align=right | 4.6 km || 
|-id=525 bgcolor=#E9E9E9
| 128525 ||  || — || August 8, 2004 || Socorro || LINEAR || MAR || align=right | 2.7 km || 
|-id=526 bgcolor=#fefefe
| 128526 ||  || — || August 8, 2004 || Socorro || LINEAR || — || align=right | 1.6 km || 
|-id=527 bgcolor=#E9E9E9
| 128527 ||  || — || August 8, 2004 || Socorro || LINEAR || HNA || align=right | 3.9 km || 
|-id=528 bgcolor=#fefefe
| 128528 ||  || — || August 8, 2004 || Socorro || LINEAR || NYS || align=right | 1.2 km || 
|-id=529 bgcolor=#d6d6d6
| 128529 ||  || — || August 8, 2004 || Socorro || LINEAR || — || align=right | 3.5 km || 
|-id=530 bgcolor=#d6d6d6
| 128530 ||  || — || August 8, 2004 || Socorro || LINEAR || TIR || align=right | 3.0 km || 
|-id=531 bgcolor=#fefefe
| 128531 ||  || — || August 8, 2004 || Socorro || LINEAR || — || align=right | 1.4 km || 
|-id=532 bgcolor=#E9E9E9
| 128532 ||  || — || August 9, 2004 || Campo Imperatore || CINEOS || ADE || align=right | 3.1 km || 
|-id=533 bgcolor=#fefefe
| 128533 ||  || — || August 9, 2004 || Socorro || LINEAR || — || align=right | 1.7 km || 
|-id=534 bgcolor=#E9E9E9
| 128534 ||  || — || August 9, 2004 || Socorro || LINEAR || — || align=right | 1.5 km || 
|-id=535 bgcolor=#E9E9E9
| 128535 ||  || — || August 9, 2004 || Socorro || LINEAR || — || align=right | 3.9 km || 
|-id=536 bgcolor=#fefefe
| 128536 ||  || — || August 9, 2004 || Socorro || LINEAR || V || align=right | 1.3 km || 
|-id=537 bgcolor=#E9E9E9
| 128537 ||  || — || August 9, 2004 || Anderson Mesa || LONEOS || — || align=right | 1.8 km || 
|-id=538 bgcolor=#E9E9E9
| 128538 ||  || — || August 9, 2004 || Socorro || LINEAR || — || align=right | 1.8 km || 
|-id=539 bgcolor=#fefefe
| 128539 ||  || — || August 10, 2004 || Socorro || LINEAR || — || align=right | 1.1 km || 
|-id=540 bgcolor=#E9E9E9
| 128540 ||  || — || August 10, 2004 || Anderson Mesa || LONEOS || — || align=right | 4.1 km || 
|-id=541 bgcolor=#fefefe
| 128541 ||  || — || August 8, 2004 || Socorro || LINEAR || MAS || align=right | 1.6 km || 
|-id=542 bgcolor=#fefefe
| 128542 ||  || — || August 9, 2004 || Socorro || LINEAR || PHO || align=right | 2.1 km || 
|-id=543 bgcolor=#d6d6d6
| 128543 ||  || — || August 5, 2004 || Palomar || NEAT || — || align=right | 8.7 km || 
|-id=544 bgcolor=#E9E9E9
| 128544 ||  || — || August 6, 2004 || Palomar || NEAT || — || align=right | 4.4 km || 
|-id=545 bgcolor=#E9E9E9
| 128545 ||  || — || August 6, 2004 || Palomar || NEAT || — || align=right | 2.2 km || 
|-id=546 bgcolor=#d6d6d6
| 128546 ||  || — || August 8, 2004 || Socorro || LINEAR || HYG || align=right | 5.4 km || 
|-id=547 bgcolor=#fefefe
| 128547 ||  || — || August 8, 2004 || Socorro || LINEAR || — || align=right | 3.3 km || 
|-id=548 bgcolor=#d6d6d6
| 128548 ||  || — || August 8, 2004 || Socorro || LINEAR || — || align=right | 5.6 km || 
|-id=549 bgcolor=#fefefe
| 128549 ||  || — || August 8, 2004 || Socorro || LINEAR || V || align=right | 1.7 km || 
|-id=550 bgcolor=#fefefe
| 128550 ||  || — || August 8, 2004 || Socorro || LINEAR || ERI || align=right | 2.3 km || 
|-id=551 bgcolor=#d6d6d6
| 128551 ||  || — || August 9, 2004 || Campo Imperatore || CINEOS || EOS || align=right | 4.6 km || 
|-id=552 bgcolor=#d6d6d6
| 128552 ||  || — || August 9, 2004 || Socorro || LINEAR || 7:4 || align=right | 4.8 km || 
|-id=553 bgcolor=#E9E9E9
| 128553 ||  || — || August 9, 2004 || Socorro || LINEAR || — || align=right | 1.7 km || 
|-id=554 bgcolor=#fefefe
| 128554 ||  || — || August 9, 2004 || Socorro || LINEAR || V || align=right | 1.4 km || 
|-id=555 bgcolor=#fefefe
| 128555 ||  || — || August 9, 2004 || Socorro || LINEAR || — || align=right | 1.3 km || 
|-id=556 bgcolor=#d6d6d6
| 128556 ||  || — || August 10, 2004 || Socorro || LINEAR || — || align=right | 4.4 km || 
|-id=557 bgcolor=#fefefe
| 128557 ||  || — || August 10, 2004 || Socorro || LINEAR || V || align=right | 1.1 km || 
|-id=558 bgcolor=#E9E9E9
| 128558 ||  || — || August 10, 2004 || Socorro || LINEAR || MAR || align=right | 2.3 km || 
|-id=559 bgcolor=#E9E9E9
| 128559 ||  || — || August 11, 2004 || Socorro || LINEAR || — || align=right | 2.9 km || 
|-id=560 bgcolor=#fefefe
| 128560 ||  || — || August 11, 2004 || Socorro || LINEAR || FLO || align=right | 1.0 km || 
|-id=561 bgcolor=#d6d6d6
| 128561 ||  || — || August 10, 2004 || Anderson Mesa || LONEOS || — || align=right | 4.2 km || 
|-id=562 bgcolor=#E9E9E9
| 128562 Murdin ||  ||  || August 10, 2004 || Anderson Mesa || LONEOS || GEF || align=right | 2.1 km || 
|-id=563 bgcolor=#E9E9E9
| 128563 ||  || — || August 10, 2004 || Socorro || LINEAR || — || align=right | 6.4 km || 
|-id=564 bgcolor=#E9E9E9
| 128564 ||  || — || August 10, 2004 || Socorro || LINEAR || — || align=right | 2.5 km || 
|-id=565 bgcolor=#fefefe
| 128565 ||  || — || August 11, 2004 || Reedy Creek || J. Broughton || — || align=right | 2.3 km || 
|-id=566 bgcolor=#d6d6d6
| 128566 ||  || — || August 11, 2004 || Reedy Creek || J. Broughton || — || align=right | 4.3 km || 
|-id=567 bgcolor=#E9E9E9
| 128567 ||  || — || August 11, 2004 || Socorro || LINEAR || — || align=right | 2.3 km || 
|-id=568 bgcolor=#fefefe
| 128568 ||  || — || August 10, 2004 || Socorro || LINEAR || — || align=right | 1.5 km || 
|-id=569 bgcolor=#E9E9E9
| 128569 ||  || — || August 12, 2004 || Socorro || LINEAR || — || align=right | 3.3 km || 
|-id=570 bgcolor=#fefefe
| 128570 ||  || — || August 11, 2004 || Socorro || LINEAR || — || align=right | 1.8 km || 
|-id=571 bgcolor=#E9E9E9
| 128571 ||  || — || August 11, 2004 || Siding Spring || SSS || MAR || align=right | 2.0 km || 
|-id=572 bgcolor=#d6d6d6
| 128572 ||  || — || August 11, 2004 || Socorro || LINEAR || ALA || align=right | 10 km || 
|-id=573 bgcolor=#fefefe
| 128573 ||  || — || August 11, 2004 || Socorro || LINEAR || V || align=right | 1.3 km || 
|-id=574 bgcolor=#d6d6d6
| 128574 ||  || — || August 11, 2004 || Socorro || LINEAR || HYG || align=right | 5.5 km || 
|-id=575 bgcolor=#d6d6d6
| 128575 ||  || — || August 12, 2004 || Socorro || LINEAR || CHA || align=right | 3.8 km || 
|-id=576 bgcolor=#d6d6d6
| 128576 ||  || — || August 12, 2004 || Socorro || LINEAR || — || align=right | 9.4 km || 
|-id=577 bgcolor=#d6d6d6
| 128577 ||  || — || August 15, 2004 || Siding Spring || SSS || — || align=right | 10 km || 
|-id=578 bgcolor=#d6d6d6
| 128578 ||  || — || August 15, 2004 || Reedy Creek || J. Broughton || EOS || align=right | 3.3 km || 
|-id=579 bgcolor=#fefefe
| 128579 ||  || — || August 9, 2004 || Siding Spring || SSS || — || align=right | 2.8 km || 
|-id=580 bgcolor=#d6d6d6
| 128580 ||  || — || August 14, 2004 || Palomar || NEAT || — || align=right | 5.7 km || 
|-id=581 bgcolor=#E9E9E9
| 128581 ||  || — || August 15, 2004 || Siding Spring || SSS || RAF || align=right | 1.3 km || 
|-id=582 bgcolor=#E9E9E9
| 128582 ||  || — || August 15, 2004 || Siding Spring || SSS || — || align=right | 3.9 km || 
|-id=583 bgcolor=#E9E9E9
| 128583 ||  || — || August 10, 2004 || Socorro || LINEAR || ADE || align=right | 2.7 km || 
|-id=584 bgcolor=#E9E9E9
| 128584 ||  || — || August 8, 2004 || Socorro || LINEAR || WIT || align=right | 1.7 km || 
|-id=585 bgcolor=#fefefe
| 128585 Alfredmaria || 2004 QV ||  || August 18, 2004 || Altschwendt || W. Ries || — || align=right | 1.6 km || 
|-id=586 bgcolor=#d6d6d6
| 128586 Jeremias || 2004 QW ||  || August 16, 2004 || Altschwendt || W. Ries || — || align=right | 6.7 km || 
|-id=587 bgcolor=#d6d6d6
| 128587 ||  || — || August 19, 2004 || Socorro || LINEAR || — || align=right | 5.0 km || 
|-id=588 bgcolor=#E9E9E9
| 128588 ||  || — || August 19, 2004 || Socorro || LINEAR || — || align=right | 2.6 km || 
|-id=589 bgcolor=#d6d6d6
| 128589 ||  || — || August 19, 2004 || Socorro || LINEAR || — || align=right | 7.0 km || 
|-id=590 bgcolor=#fefefe
| 128590 ||  || — || August 19, 2004 || Socorro || LINEAR || — || align=right | 2.4 km || 
|-id=591 bgcolor=#fefefe
| 128591 ||  || — || August 19, 2004 || Siding Spring || SSS || V || align=right | 1.1 km || 
|-id=592 bgcolor=#fefefe
| 128592 ||  || — || August 21, 2004 || Reedy Creek || J. Broughton || — || align=right | 1.6 km || 
|-id=593 bgcolor=#E9E9E9
| 128593 Balfourwhitney ||  ||  || August 20, 2004 || Goodricke-Pigott || R. A. Tucker || AEO || align=right | 2.8 km || 
|-id=594 bgcolor=#E9E9E9
| 128594 ||  || — || August 16, 2004 || Siding Spring || SSS || EUN || align=right | 2.2 km || 
|-id=595 bgcolor=#d6d6d6
| 128595 ||  || — || August 21, 2004 || Siding Spring || SSS || — || align=right | 6.1 km || 
|-id=596 bgcolor=#d6d6d6
| 128596 ||  || — || August 21, 2004 || Siding Spring || SSS || EOS || align=right | 3.1 km || 
|-id=597 bgcolor=#E9E9E9
| 128597 ||  || — || August 21, 2004 || Siding Spring || SSS || EUN || align=right | 1.6 km || 
|-id=598 bgcolor=#fefefe
| 128598 ||  || — || August 21, 2004 || Siding Spring || SSS || — || align=right | 1.3 km || 
|-id=599 bgcolor=#fefefe
| 128599 ||  || — || August 21, 2004 || Siding Spring || SSS || — || align=right | 1.2 km || 
|-id=600 bgcolor=#fefefe
| 128600 ||  || — || August 21, 2004 || Siding Spring || SSS || — || align=right | 1.3 km || 
|}

128601–128700 

|-bgcolor=#d6d6d6
| 128601 ||  || — || August 21, 2004 || Siding Spring || SSS || — || align=right | 5.7 km || 
|-id=602 bgcolor=#d6d6d6
| 128602 Careyparish ||  ||  || August 21, 2004 || Catalina || CSS || — || align=right | 3.6 km || 
|-id=603 bgcolor=#d6d6d6
| 128603 ||  || — || August 22, 2004 || Kvistaberg || UDAS || EOS || align=right | 3.4 km || 
|-id=604 bgcolor=#d6d6d6
| 128604 Markfisher ||  ||  || August 21, 2004 || Catalina || CSS || — || align=right | 4.4 km || 
|-id=605 bgcolor=#E9E9E9
| 128605 ||  || — || August 22, 2004 || Kitt Peak || Spacewatch || GEF || align=right | 2.1 km || 
|-id=606 bgcolor=#E9E9E9
| 128606 ||  || — || August 19, 2004 || Socorro || LINEAR || EUN || align=right | 2.3 km || 
|-id=607 bgcolor=#fefefe
| 128607 Richhund ||  ||  || August 20, 2004 || Catalina || CSS || — || align=right | 1.4 km || 
|-id=608 bgcolor=#fefefe
| 128608 Chucklove ||  ||  || August 21, 2004 || Catalina || CSS || — || align=right | 1.1 km || 
|-id=609 bgcolor=#d6d6d6
| 128609 ||  || — || August 22, 2004 || Kvistaberg || UDAS || VER || align=right | 6.8 km || 
|-id=610 bgcolor=#d6d6d6
| 128610 Stasiahabenicht ||  ||  || August 20, 2004 || Catalina || CSS || — || align=right | 3.6 km || 
|-id=611 bgcolor=#E9E9E9
| 128611 Paulnowak ||  ||  || August 20, 2004 || Catalina || CSS || — || align=right | 3.0 km || 
|-id=612 bgcolor=#d6d6d6
| 128612 ||  || — || August 25, 2004 || Kitt Peak || Spacewatch || HYG || align=right | 5.0 km || 
|-id=613 bgcolor=#d6d6d6
| 128613 ||  || — || August 24, 2004 || Socorro || LINEAR || EUP || align=right | 6.9 km || 
|-id=614 bgcolor=#fefefe
| 128614 Juliabest ||  ||  || August 21, 2004 || Catalina || CSS || NYS || align=right | 1.3 km || 
|-id=615 bgcolor=#fefefe
| 128615 Jimharris ||  ||  || August 26, 2004 || Catalina || CSS || — || align=right | 1.3 km || 
|-id=616 bgcolor=#fefefe
| 128616 ||  || — || August 24, 2004 || Siding Spring || SSS || — || align=right | 2.2 km || 
|-id=617 bgcolor=#fefefe
| 128617 ||  || — || August 24, 2004 || Siding Spring || SSS || H || align=right | 1.2 km || 
|-id=618 bgcolor=#d6d6d6
| 128618 ||  || — || August 19, 2004 || Socorro || LINEAR || — || align=right | 9.4 km || 
|-id=619 bgcolor=#E9E9E9
| 128619 ||  || — || August 25, 2004 || Anderson Mesa || LONEOS || HNS || align=right | 3.0 km || 
|-id=620 bgcolor=#E9E9E9
| 128620 ||  || — || August 25, 2004 || Socorro || LINEAR || — || align=right | 7.3 km || 
|-id=621 bgcolor=#d6d6d6
| 128621 || 2004 RD || — || September 2, 2004 || Wrightwood || J. W. Young || — || align=right | 3.9 km || 
|-id=622 bgcolor=#d6d6d6
| 128622 Rudiš || 2004 RU ||  || September 4, 2004 || Kleť || KLENOT || — || align=right | 3.8 km || 
|-id=623 bgcolor=#fefefe
| 128623 ||  || — || September 5, 2004 || Bergisch Gladbach || W. Bickel || CLA || align=right | 2.5 km || 
|-id=624 bgcolor=#fefefe
| 128624 ||  || — || September 4, 2004 || Palomar || NEAT || V || align=right | 1.0 km || 
|-id=625 bgcolor=#d6d6d6
| 128625 ||  || — || September 4, 2004 || Palomar || NEAT || — || align=right | 5.6 km || 
|-id=626 bgcolor=#d6d6d6
| 128626 ||  || — || September 5, 2004 || Palomar || NEAT || EOS || align=right | 3.8 km || 
|-id=627 bgcolor=#d6d6d6
| 128627 Ottmarsheim ||  ||  || September 6, 2004 || Ottmarsheim || C. Rinner || HYG || align=right | 5.6 km || 
|-id=628 bgcolor=#E9E9E9
| 128628 ||  || — || September 6, 2004 || Goodricke-Pigott || Goodricke-Pigott Obs. || AEO || align=right | 3.2 km || 
|-id=629 bgcolor=#d6d6d6
| 128629 ||  || — || September 7, 2004 || Vicques || M. Ory || — || align=right | 5.3 km || 
|-id=630 bgcolor=#d6d6d6
| 128630 ||  || — || September 6, 2004 || Siding Spring || SSS || — || align=right | 3.2 km || 
|-id=631 bgcolor=#fefefe
| 128631 ||  || — || September 6, 2004 || Siding Spring || SSS || V || align=right data-sort-value="0.94" | 940 m || 
|-id=632 bgcolor=#d6d6d6
| 128632 ||  || — || September 7, 2004 || Socorro || LINEAR || 3:2 || align=right | 8.1 km || 
|-id=633 bgcolor=#d6d6d6
| 128633 Queyras ||  ||  || September 8, 2004 || Saint-Véran || Saint-Véran Obs. || 7:4 || align=right | 7.9 km || 
|-id=634 bgcolor=#fefefe
| 128634 ||  || — || September 4, 2004 || Palomar || NEAT || FLO || align=right | 1.1 km || 
|-id=635 bgcolor=#fefefe
| 128635 ||  || — || September 7, 2004 || Socorro || LINEAR || V || align=right | 1.1 km || 
|-id=636 bgcolor=#E9E9E9
| 128636 ||  || — || September 7, 2004 || Kitt Peak || Spacewatch || — || align=right | 2.1 km || 
|-id=637 bgcolor=#E9E9E9
| 128637 ||  || — || September 7, 2004 || Kitt Peak || Spacewatch || — || align=right | 3.7 km || 
|-id=638 bgcolor=#fefefe
| 128638 ||  || — || September 7, 2004 || Kitt Peak || Spacewatch || NYS || align=right | 1.2 km || 
|-id=639 bgcolor=#fefefe
| 128639 ||  || — || September 7, 2004 || Kitt Peak || Spacewatch || MAS || align=right | 1.0 km || 
|-id=640 bgcolor=#fefefe
| 128640 ||  || — || September 7, 2004 || Kitt Peak || Spacewatch || EUT || align=right | 1.2 km || 
|-id=641 bgcolor=#fefefe
| 128641 ||  || — || September 6, 2004 || Siding Spring || SSS || NYS || align=right | 2.5 km || 
|-id=642 bgcolor=#E9E9E9
| 128642 ||  || — || September 6, 2004 || Palomar || NEAT || — || align=right | 1.4 km || 
|-id=643 bgcolor=#fefefe
| 128643 ||  || — || September 7, 2004 || Socorro || LINEAR || — || align=right | 1.0 km || 
|-id=644 bgcolor=#fefefe
| 128644 ||  || — || September 7, 2004 || Socorro || LINEAR || MAS || align=right | 1.1 km || 
|-id=645 bgcolor=#fefefe
| 128645 ||  || — || September 7, 2004 || Socorro || LINEAR || — || align=right | 1.2 km || 
|-id=646 bgcolor=#E9E9E9
| 128646 ||  || — || September 7, 2004 || Socorro || LINEAR || — || align=right | 2.4 km || 
|-id=647 bgcolor=#E9E9E9
| 128647 ||  || — || September 7, 2004 || Kitt Peak || Spacewatch || AST || align=right | 3.4 km || 
|-id=648 bgcolor=#d6d6d6
| 128648 ||  || — || September 8, 2004 || Socorro || LINEAR || slow || align=right | 3.5 km || 
|-id=649 bgcolor=#fefefe
| 128649 ||  || — || September 8, 2004 || Socorro || LINEAR || V || align=right | 1.2 km || 
|-id=650 bgcolor=#d6d6d6
| 128650 ||  || — || September 8, 2004 || Palomar || NEAT || — || align=right | 4.7 km || 
|-id=651 bgcolor=#fefefe
| 128651 ||  || — || September 8, 2004 || Socorro || LINEAR || V || align=right | 1.2 km || 
|-id=652 bgcolor=#fefefe
| 128652 ||  || — || September 8, 2004 || Socorro || LINEAR || — || align=right data-sort-value="0.87" | 870 m || 
|-id=653 bgcolor=#d6d6d6
| 128653 ||  || — || September 8, 2004 || Socorro || LINEAR || THM || align=right | 4.1 km || 
|-id=654 bgcolor=#E9E9E9
| 128654 ||  || — || September 8, 2004 || Socorro || LINEAR || — || align=right | 2.2 km || 
|-id=655 bgcolor=#E9E9E9
| 128655 ||  || — || September 8, 2004 || Socorro || LINEAR || — || align=right | 1.2 km || 
|-id=656 bgcolor=#fefefe
| 128656 ||  || — || September 8, 2004 || Socorro || LINEAR || V || align=right | 1.5 km || 
|-id=657 bgcolor=#fefefe
| 128657 ||  || — || September 8, 2004 || Socorro || LINEAR || — || align=right | 1.4 km || 
|-id=658 bgcolor=#fefefe
| 128658 ||  || — || September 8, 2004 || Socorro || LINEAR || NYS || align=right | 1.3 km || 
|-id=659 bgcolor=#E9E9E9
| 128659 ||  || — || September 8, 2004 || Socorro || LINEAR || — || align=right | 4.4 km || 
|-id=660 bgcolor=#fefefe
| 128660 ||  || — || September 8, 2004 || Socorro || LINEAR || — || align=right | 2.2 km || 
|-id=661 bgcolor=#fefefe
| 128661 ||  || — || September 8, 2004 || Socorro || LINEAR || — || align=right | 1.6 km || 
|-id=662 bgcolor=#d6d6d6
| 128662 ||  || — || September 8, 2004 || Socorro || LINEAR || — || align=right | 5.0 km || 
|-id=663 bgcolor=#fefefe
| 128663 ||  || — || September 8, 2004 || Socorro || LINEAR || — || align=right | 1.3 km || 
|-id=664 bgcolor=#fefefe
| 128664 ||  || — || September 8, 2004 || Socorro || LINEAR || NYS || align=right | 1.1 km || 
|-id=665 bgcolor=#d6d6d6
| 128665 ||  || — || September 8, 2004 || Socorro || LINEAR || — || align=right | 2.3 km || 
|-id=666 bgcolor=#fefefe
| 128666 ||  || — || September 8, 2004 || Socorro || LINEAR || — || align=right | 1.6 km || 
|-id=667 bgcolor=#fefefe
| 128667 ||  || — || September 8, 2004 || Socorro || LINEAR || — || align=right | 1.1 km || 
|-id=668 bgcolor=#fefefe
| 128668 ||  || — || September 8, 2004 || Socorro || LINEAR || — || align=right | 1.1 km || 
|-id=669 bgcolor=#E9E9E9
| 128669 ||  || — || September 8, 2004 || Socorro || LINEAR || — || align=right | 2.6 km || 
|-id=670 bgcolor=#E9E9E9
| 128670 ||  || — || September 8, 2004 || Socorro || LINEAR || — || align=right | 3.1 km || 
|-id=671 bgcolor=#fefefe
| 128671 ||  || — || September 8, 2004 || Socorro || LINEAR || — || align=right | 1.2 km || 
|-id=672 bgcolor=#fefefe
| 128672 ||  || — || September 8, 2004 || Socorro || LINEAR || — || align=right | 1.3 km || 
|-id=673 bgcolor=#E9E9E9
| 128673 ||  || — || September 8, 2004 || Socorro || LINEAR || — || align=right | 4.1 km || 
|-id=674 bgcolor=#fefefe
| 128674 ||  || — || September 8, 2004 || Socorro || LINEAR || MAS || align=right | 1.2 km || 
|-id=675 bgcolor=#E9E9E9
| 128675 ||  || — || September 8, 2004 || Socorro || LINEAR || HEN || align=right | 1.6 km || 
|-id=676 bgcolor=#fefefe
| 128676 ||  || — || September 8, 2004 || Socorro || LINEAR || V || align=right | 1.3 km || 
|-id=677 bgcolor=#d6d6d6
| 128677 ||  || — || September 8, 2004 || Socorro || LINEAR || — || align=right | 6.2 km || 
|-id=678 bgcolor=#fefefe
| 128678 ||  || — || September 8, 2004 || Socorro || LINEAR || NYS || align=right | 1.2 km || 
|-id=679 bgcolor=#fefefe
| 128679 ||  || — || September 8, 2004 || Socorro || LINEAR || V || align=right | 1.2 km || 
|-id=680 bgcolor=#d6d6d6
| 128680 ||  || — || September 8, 2004 || Socorro || LINEAR || — || align=right | 4.8 km || 
|-id=681 bgcolor=#E9E9E9
| 128681 ||  || — || September 8, 2004 || Socorro || LINEAR || — || align=right | 3.9 km || 
|-id=682 bgcolor=#d6d6d6
| 128682 ||  || — || September 8, 2004 || Socorro || LINEAR || THM || align=right | 3.8 km || 
|-id=683 bgcolor=#d6d6d6
| 128683 ||  || — || September 8, 2004 || Socorro || LINEAR || HYG || align=right | 5.8 km || 
|-id=684 bgcolor=#fefefe
| 128684 ||  || — || September 8, 2004 || Socorro || LINEAR || PHO || align=right | 1.8 km || 
|-id=685 bgcolor=#d6d6d6
| 128685 ||  || — || September 7, 2004 || Socorro || LINEAR || EUP || align=right | 7.6 km || 
|-id=686 bgcolor=#fefefe
| 128686 ||  || — || September 7, 2004 || Socorro || LINEAR || — || align=right | 1.4 km || 
|-id=687 bgcolor=#fefefe
| 128687 ||  || — || September 8, 2004 || Palomar || NEAT || FLO || align=right data-sort-value="0.88" | 880 m || 
|-id=688 bgcolor=#fefefe
| 128688 ||  || — || September 9, 2004 || Socorro || LINEAR || V || align=right | 1.2 km || 
|-id=689 bgcolor=#E9E9E9
| 128689 ||  || — || September 9, 2004 || Socorro || LINEAR || MIS || align=right | 4.4 km || 
|-id=690 bgcolor=#E9E9E9
| 128690 ||  || — || September 7, 2004 || Socorro || LINEAR || GEF || align=right | 2.6 km || 
|-id=691 bgcolor=#E9E9E9
| 128691 ||  || — || September 8, 2004 || Socorro || LINEAR || — || align=right | 2.2 km || 
|-id=692 bgcolor=#fefefe
| 128692 ||  || — || September 8, 2004 || Socorro || LINEAR || — || align=right | 1.0 km || 
|-id=693 bgcolor=#d6d6d6
| 128693 ||  || — || September 8, 2004 || Socorro || LINEAR || slow || align=right | 5.3 km || 
|-id=694 bgcolor=#E9E9E9
| 128694 ||  || — || September 8, 2004 || Socorro || LINEAR || — || align=right | 4.2 km || 
|-id=695 bgcolor=#d6d6d6
| 128695 ||  || — || September 8, 2004 || Palomar || NEAT || — || align=right | 5.4 km || 
|-id=696 bgcolor=#E9E9E9
| 128696 ||  || — || September 8, 2004 || Socorro || LINEAR || — || align=right | 2.4 km || 
|-id=697 bgcolor=#fefefe
| 128697 ||  || — || September 8, 2004 || Socorro || LINEAR || — || align=right | 1.1 km || 
|-id=698 bgcolor=#E9E9E9
| 128698 ||  || — || September 8, 2004 || Socorro || LINEAR || — || align=right | 2.2 km || 
|-id=699 bgcolor=#fefefe
| 128699 ||  || — || September 8, 2004 || Socorro || LINEAR || V || align=right | 1.1 km || 
|-id=700 bgcolor=#E9E9E9
| 128700 ||  || — || September 8, 2004 || Socorro || LINEAR || — || align=right | 3.1 km || 
|}

128701–128800 

|-bgcolor=#E9E9E9
| 128701 ||  || — || September 8, 2004 || Socorro || LINEAR || — || align=right | 1.6 km || 
|-id=702 bgcolor=#fefefe
| 128702 ||  || — || September 8, 2004 || Socorro || LINEAR || — || align=right | 1.2 km || 
|-id=703 bgcolor=#E9E9E9
| 128703 ||  || — || September 8, 2004 || Socorro || LINEAR || AGN || align=right | 2.1 km || 
|-id=704 bgcolor=#E9E9E9
| 128704 ||  || — || September 8, 2004 || Palomar || NEAT || — || align=right | 4.0 km || 
|-id=705 bgcolor=#d6d6d6
| 128705 ||  || — || September 8, 2004 || Palomar || NEAT || — || align=right | 6.6 km || 
|-id=706 bgcolor=#fefefe
| 128706 ||  || — || September 8, 2004 || Palomar || NEAT || — || align=right | 1.5 km || 
|-id=707 bgcolor=#d6d6d6
| 128707 ||  || — || September 8, 2004 || Palomar || NEAT || — || align=right | 3.6 km || 
|-id=708 bgcolor=#d6d6d6
| 128708 ||  || — || September 8, 2004 || Palomar || NEAT || EOS || align=right | 4.0 km || 
|-id=709 bgcolor=#d6d6d6
| 128709 ||  || — || September 8, 2004 || Palomar || NEAT || — || align=right | 6.0 km || 
|-id=710 bgcolor=#fefefe
| 128710 ||  || — || September 8, 2004 || Palomar || NEAT || V || align=right | 1.0 km || 
|-id=711 bgcolor=#d6d6d6
| 128711 ||  || — || September 9, 2004 || Socorro || LINEAR || KOR || align=right | 2.5 km || 
|-id=712 bgcolor=#fefefe
| 128712 ||  || — || September 9, 2004 || Socorro || LINEAR || — || align=right | 1.4 km || 
|-id=713 bgcolor=#d6d6d6
| 128713 ||  || — || September 6, 2004 || Socorro || LINEAR || — || align=right | 6.0 km || 
|-id=714 bgcolor=#d6d6d6
| 128714 ||  || — || September 6, 2004 || Socorro || LINEAR || — || align=right | 5.8 km || 
|-id=715 bgcolor=#fefefe
| 128715 ||  || — || September 7, 2004 || Socorro || LINEAR || — || align=right | 1.3 km || 
|-id=716 bgcolor=#d6d6d6
| 128716 ||  || — || September 7, 2004 || Kitt Peak || Spacewatch || — || align=right | 2.7 km || 
|-id=717 bgcolor=#fefefe
| 128717 ||  || — || September 7, 2004 || Kitt Peak || Spacewatch || — || align=right | 1.0 km || 
|-id=718 bgcolor=#d6d6d6
| 128718 ||  || — || September 7, 2004 || Socorro || LINEAR || — || align=right | 4.5 km || 
|-id=719 bgcolor=#E9E9E9
| 128719 ||  || — || September 7, 2004 || Socorro || LINEAR || — || align=right | 3.4 km || 
|-id=720 bgcolor=#fefefe
| 128720 ||  || — || September 7, 2004 || Kitt Peak || Spacewatch || — || align=right | 1.0 km || 
|-id=721 bgcolor=#E9E9E9
| 128721 ||  || — || September 8, 2004 || Kleť || Kleť Obs. || HOF || align=right | 4.3 km || 
|-id=722 bgcolor=#E9E9E9
| 128722 ||  || — || September 8, 2004 || Socorro || LINEAR || — || align=right | 5.0 km || 
|-id=723 bgcolor=#d6d6d6
| 128723 ||  || — || September 8, 2004 || Socorro || LINEAR || — || align=right | 5.7 km || 
|-id=724 bgcolor=#E9E9E9
| 128724 ||  || — || September 8, 2004 || Socorro || LINEAR || — || align=right | 4.3 km || 
|-id=725 bgcolor=#d6d6d6
| 128725 ||  || — || September 8, 2004 || Socorro || LINEAR || HYG || align=right | 4.9 km || 
|-id=726 bgcolor=#E9E9E9
| 128726 ||  || — || September 8, 2004 || Socorro || LINEAR || NEM || align=right | 4.1 km || 
|-id=727 bgcolor=#fefefe
| 128727 ||  || — || September 8, 2004 || Socorro || LINEAR || — || align=right | 1.3 km || 
|-id=728 bgcolor=#E9E9E9
| 128728 ||  || — || September 8, 2004 || Socorro || LINEAR || — || align=right | 4.1 km || 
|-id=729 bgcolor=#d6d6d6
| 128729 ||  || — || September 8, 2004 || Socorro || LINEAR || — || align=right | 5.7 km || 
|-id=730 bgcolor=#E9E9E9
| 128730 ||  || — || September 9, 2004 || Socorro || LINEAR || GEF || align=right | 2.4 km || 
|-id=731 bgcolor=#E9E9E9
| 128731 ||  || — || September 9, 2004 || Socorro || LINEAR || — || align=right | 2.8 km || 
|-id=732 bgcolor=#fefefe
| 128732 ||  || — || September 10, 2004 || Socorro || LINEAR || — || align=right | 1.8 km || 
|-id=733 bgcolor=#d6d6d6
| 128733 ||  || — || September 10, 2004 || Socorro || LINEAR || — || align=right | 5.7 km || 
|-id=734 bgcolor=#d6d6d6
| 128734 ||  || — || September 10, 2004 || Socorro || LINEAR || EOS || align=right | 3.8 km || 
|-id=735 bgcolor=#d6d6d6
| 128735 ||  || — || September 10, 2004 || Socorro || LINEAR || — || align=right | 4.7 km || 
|-id=736 bgcolor=#fefefe
| 128736 ||  || — || September 10, 2004 || Socorro || LINEAR || — || align=right | 1.4 km || 
|-id=737 bgcolor=#d6d6d6
| 128737 ||  || — || September 10, 2004 || Socorro || LINEAR || — || align=right | 4.3 km || 
|-id=738 bgcolor=#fefefe
| 128738 ||  || — || September 10, 2004 || Socorro || LINEAR || — || align=right | 1.6 km || 
|-id=739 bgcolor=#fefefe
| 128739 ||  || — || September 10, 2004 || Socorro || LINEAR || FLO || align=right data-sort-value="0.92" | 920 m || 
|-id=740 bgcolor=#fefefe
| 128740 ||  || — || September 10, 2004 || Socorro || LINEAR || — || align=right | 1.4 km || 
|-id=741 bgcolor=#d6d6d6
| 128741 ||  || — || September 10, 2004 || Socorro || LINEAR || URS || align=right | 5.3 km || 
|-id=742 bgcolor=#d6d6d6
| 128742 ||  || — || September 11, 2004 || Socorro || LINEAR || — || align=right | 5.9 km || 
|-id=743 bgcolor=#d6d6d6
| 128743 ||  || — || September 11, 2004 || Socorro || LINEAR || EUP || align=right | 6.5 km || 
|-id=744 bgcolor=#fefefe
| 128744 ||  || — || September 8, 2004 || Palomar || NEAT || V || align=right | 1.2 km || 
|-id=745 bgcolor=#d6d6d6
| 128745 ||  || — || September 8, 2004 || Palomar || NEAT || — || align=right | 5.8 km || 
|-id=746 bgcolor=#fefefe
| 128746 ||  || — || September 10, 2004 || Socorro || LINEAR || — || align=right | 1.4 km || 
|-id=747 bgcolor=#E9E9E9
| 128747 ||  || — || September 10, 2004 || Socorro || LINEAR || — || align=right | 1.7 km || 
|-id=748 bgcolor=#fefefe
| 128748 ||  || — || September 10, 2004 || Socorro || LINEAR || V || align=right | 1.1 km || 
|-id=749 bgcolor=#fefefe
| 128749 ||  || — || September 10, 2004 || Socorro || LINEAR || — || align=right | 1.9 km || 
|-id=750 bgcolor=#d6d6d6
| 128750 ||  || — || September 10, 2004 || Socorro || LINEAR || — || align=right | 5.5 km || 
|-id=751 bgcolor=#E9E9E9
| 128751 ||  || — || September 10, 2004 || Socorro || LINEAR || MRX || align=right | 1.8 km || 
|-id=752 bgcolor=#E9E9E9
| 128752 ||  || — || September 10, 2004 || Socorro || LINEAR || — || align=right | 1.5 km || 
|-id=753 bgcolor=#d6d6d6
| 128753 ||  || — || September 10, 2004 || Socorro || LINEAR || — || align=right | 5.1 km || 
|-id=754 bgcolor=#d6d6d6
| 128754 ||  || — || September 10, 2004 || Socorro || LINEAR || — || align=right | 5.7 km || 
|-id=755 bgcolor=#E9E9E9
| 128755 ||  || — || September 10, 2004 || Socorro || LINEAR || EUN || align=right | 2.8 km || 
|-id=756 bgcolor=#fefefe
| 128756 ||  || — || September 10, 2004 || Socorro || LINEAR || FLO || align=right | 1.1 km || 
|-id=757 bgcolor=#fefefe
| 128757 ||  || — || September 10, 2004 || Socorro || LINEAR || V || align=right | 1.2 km || 
|-id=758 bgcolor=#d6d6d6
| 128758 ||  || — || September 10, 2004 || Socorro || LINEAR || — || align=right | 7.3 km || 
|-id=759 bgcolor=#d6d6d6
| 128759 ||  || — || September 10, 2004 || Socorro || LINEAR || — || align=right | 5.8 km || 
|-id=760 bgcolor=#d6d6d6
| 128760 ||  || — || September 10, 2004 || Socorro || LINEAR || — || align=right | 7.0 km || 
|-id=761 bgcolor=#fefefe
| 128761 ||  || — || September 10, 2004 || Socorro || LINEAR || NYS || align=right | 1.1 km || 
|-id=762 bgcolor=#E9E9E9
| 128762 ||  || — || September 10, 2004 || Socorro || LINEAR || — || align=right | 4.7 km || 
|-id=763 bgcolor=#E9E9E9
| 128763 ||  || — || September 10, 2004 || Socorro || LINEAR || — || align=right | 3.5 km || 
|-id=764 bgcolor=#fefefe
| 128764 ||  || — || September 10, 2004 || Socorro || LINEAR || — || align=right | 1.3 km || 
|-id=765 bgcolor=#d6d6d6
| 128765 ||  || — || September 10, 2004 || Socorro || LINEAR || — || align=right | 4.6 km || 
|-id=766 bgcolor=#fefefe
| 128766 ||  || — || September 10, 2004 || Socorro || LINEAR || V || align=right | 1.1 km || 
|-id=767 bgcolor=#d6d6d6
| 128767 ||  || — || September 10, 2004 || Socorro || LINEAR || EOS || align=right | 3.8 km || 
|-id=768 bgcolor=#d6d6d6
| 128768 ||  || — || September 10, 2004 || Socorro || LINEAR || — || align=right | 4.3 km || 
|-id=769 bgcolor=#d6d6d6
| 128769 ||  || — || September 10, 2004 || Socorro || LINEAR || — || align=right | 6.7 km || 
|-id=770 bgcolor=#E9E9E9
| 128770 ||  || — || September 10, 2004 || Socorro || LINEAR || MRX || align=right | 1.6 km || 
|-id=771 bgcolor=#fefefe
| 128771 ||  || — || September 10, 2004 || Socorro || LINEAR || V || align=right | 1.4 km || 
|-id=772 bgcolor=#fefefe
| 128772 ||  || — || September 10, 2004 || Socorro || LINEAR || — || align=right | 1.7 km || 
|-id=773 bgcolor=#E9E9E9
| 128773 ||  || — || September 10, 2004 || Socorro || LINEAR || — || align=right | 2.7 km || 
|-id=774 bgcolor=#fefefe
| 128774 ||  || — || September 10, 2004 || Socorro || LINEAR || — || align=right | 2.0 km || 
|-id=775 bgcolor=#d6d6d6
| 128775 ||  || — || September 10, 2004 || Socorro || LINEAR || — || align=right | 7.3 km || 
|-id=776 bgcolor=#E9E9E9
| 128776 ||  || — || September 10, 2004 || Socorro || LINEAR || — || align=right | 3.9 km || 
|-id=777 bgcolor=#E9E9E9
| 128777 ||  || — || September 10, 2004 || Socorro || LINEAR || — || align=right | 4.2 km || 
|-id=778 bgcolor=#E9E9E9
| 128778 ||  || — || September 10, 2004 || Socorro || LINEAR || — || align=right | 5.9 km || 
|-id=779 bgcolor=#E9E9E9
| 128779 ||  || — || September 10, 2004 || Socorro || LINEAR || EUN || align=right | 3.0 km || 
|-id=780 bgcolor=#d6d6d6
| 128780 ||  || — || September 10, 2004 || Socorro || LINEAR || — || align=right | 6.6 km || 
|-id=781 bgcolor=#d6d6d6
| 128781 ||  || — || September 11, 2004 || Kitt Peak || Spacewatch || — || align=right | 3.7 km || 
|-id=782 bgcolor=#d6d6d6
| 128782 ||  || — || September 11, 2004 || Socorro || LINEAR || — || align=right | 6.2 km || 
|-id=783 bgcolor=#E9E9E9
| 128783 ||  || — || September 11, 2004 || Socorro || LINEAR || — || align=right | 4.1 km || 
|-id=784 bgcolor=#E9E9E9
| 128784 ||  || — || September 11, 2004 || Socorro || LINEAR || WAT || align=right | 3.9 km || 
|-id=785 bgcolor=#d6d6d6
| 128785 ||  || — || September 11, 2004 || Socorro || LINEAR || TIR || align=right | 5.0 km || 
|-id=786 bgcolor=#E9E9E9
| 128786 ||  || — || September 11, 2004 || Socorro || LINEAR || — || align=right | 2.5 km || 
|-id=787 bgcolor=#E9E9E9
| 128787 ||  || — || September 11, 2004 || Socorro || LINEAR || — || align=right | 3.4 km || 
|-id=788 bgcolor=#d6d6d6
| 128788 ||  || — || September 11, 2004 || Socorro || LINEAR || — || align=right | 6.1 km || 
|-id=789 bgcolor=#fefefe
| 128789 ||  || — || September 11, 2004 || Socorro || LINEAR || — || align=right | 2.3 km || 
|-id=790 bgcolor=#E9E9E9
| 128790 ||  || — || September 11, 2004 || Socorro || LINEAR || — || align=right | 4.7 km || 
|-id=791 bgcolor=#E9E9E9
| 128791 ||  || — || September 11, 2004 || Socorro || LINEAR || — || align=right | 4.9 km || 
|-id=792 bgcolor=#d6d6d6
| 128792 ||  || — || September 11, 2004 || Socorro || LINEAR || — || align=right | 5.2 km || 
|-id=793 bgcolor=#E9E9E9
| 128793 ||  || — || September 11, 2004 || Socorro || LINEAR || ADE || align=right | 3.6 km || 
|-id=794 bgcolor=#d6d6d6
| 128794 ||  || — || September 11, 2004 || Socorro || LINEAR || — || align=right | 6.6 km || 
|-id=795 bgcolor=#E9E9E9
| 128795 Douglaswalker ||  ||  || September 13, 2004 || Goodricke-Pigott || R. A. Tucker || AGN || align=right | 2.1 km || 
|-id=796 bgcolor=#fefefe
| 128796 ||  || — || September 7, 2004 || Socorro || LINEAR || — || align=right | 1.6 km || 
|-id=797 bgcolor=#E9E9E9
| 128797 ||  || — || September 7, 2004 || Kitt Peak || Spacewatch || — || align=right | 1.7 km || 
|-id=798 bgcolor=#E9E9E9
| 128798 ||  || — || September 7, 2004 || Kitt Peak || Spacewatch || — || align=right | 1.6 km || 
|-id=799 bgcolor=#fefefe
| 128799 ||  || — || September 9, 2004 || Socorro || LINEAR || MAS || align=right | 1.4 km || 
|-id=800 bgcolor=#E9E9E9
| 128800 ||  || — || September 9, 2004 || Kitt Peak || Spacewatch || HEN || align=right | 1.7 km || 
|}

128801–128900 

|-bgcolor=#fefefe
| 128801 ||  || — || September 9, 2004 || Kitt Peak || Spacewatch || — || align=right | 1.2 km || 
|-id=802 bgcolor=#E9E9E9
| 128802 ||  || — || September 9, 2004 || Kitt Peak || Spacewatch || WIT || align=right | 2.1 km || 
|-id=803 bgcolor=#fefefe
| 128803 ||  || — || September 10, 2004 || Socorro || LINEAR || — || align=right | 1.5 km || 
|-id=804 bgcolor=#fefefe
| 128804 ||  || — || September 12, 2004 || Socorro || LINEAR || PHO || align=right | 2.2 km || 
|-id=805 bgcolor=#fefefe
| 128805 ||  || — || September 13, 2004 || Socorro || LINEAR || NYS || align=right data-sort-value="0.89" | 890 m || 
|-id=806 bgcolor=#E9E9E9
| 128806 ||  || — || September 13, 2004 || Palomar || NEAT || — || align=right | 3.4 km || 
|-id=807 bgcolor=#E9E9E9
| 128807 ||  || — || September 6, 2004 || Palomar || NEAT || EUN || align=right | 2.2 km || 
|-id=808 bgcolor=#E9E9E9
| 128808 ||  || — || September 6, 2004 || Palomar || NEAT || — || align=right | 3.3 km || 
|-id=809 bgcolor=#d6d6d6
| 128809 ||  || — || September 6, 2004 || Palomar || NEAT || — || align=right | 5.5 km || 
|-id=810 bgcolor=#E9E9E9
| 128810 ||  || — || September 6, 2004 || Palomar || NEAT || MAR || align=right | 2.5 km || 
|-id=811 bgcolor=#d6d6d6
| 128811 ||  || — || September 6, 2004 || Palomar || NEAT || — || align=right | 6.4 km || 
|-id=812 bgcolor=#E9E9E9
| 128812 ||  || — || September 6, 2004 || Palomar || NEAT || — || align=right | 1.9 km || 
|-id=813 bgcolor=#fefefe
| 128813 ||  || — || September 15, 2004 || 7300 Observatory || W. K. Y. Yeung || MAS || align=right | 1.2 km || 
|-id=814 bgcolor=#E9E9E9
| 128814 ||  || — || September 15, 2004 || 7300 Observatory || W. K. Y. Yeung || — || align=right | 3.0 km || 
|-id=815 bgcolor=#d6d6d6
| 128815 ||  || — || September 15, 2004 || 7300 Observatory || W. K. Y. Yeung || THM || align=right | 3.0 km || 
|-id=816 bgcolor=#d6d6d6
| 128816 ||  || — || September 9, 2004 || Kitt Peak || Spacewatch || HYG || align=right | 3.8 km || 
|-id=817 bgcolor=#E9E9E9
| 128817 ||  || — || September 10, 2004 || Socorro || LINEAR || RAF || align=right | 1.8 km || 
|-id=818 bgcolor=#d6d6d6
| 128818 ||  || — || September 11, 2004 || Palomar || NEAT || EOS || align=right | 3.7 km || 
|-id=819 bgcolor=#fefefe
| 128819 ||  || — || September 11, 2004 || Kitt Peak || Spacewatch || FLO || align=right | 1.1 km || 
|-id=820 bgcolor=#E9E9E9
| 128820 ||  || — || September 12, 2004 || Kitt Peak || Spacewatch || — || align=right | 1.9 km || 
|-id=821 bgcolor=#d6d6d6
| 128821 ||  || — || September 12, 2004 || Socorro || LINEAR || — || align=right | 6.9 km || 
|-id=822 bgcolor=#fefefe
| 128822 ||  || — || September 12, 2004 || Socorro || LINEAR || FLO || align=right | 1.3 km || 
|-id=823 bgcolor=#E9E9E9
| 128823 ||  || — || September 13, 2004 || Socorro || LINEAR || — || align=right | 2.2 km || 
|-id=824 bgcolor=#d6d6d6
| 128824 ||  || — || September 13, 2004 || Socorro || LINEAR || — || align=right | 6.3 km || 
|-id=825 bgcolor=#fefefe
| 128825 ||  || — || September 13, 2004 || Socorro || LINEAR || V || align=right | 1.3 km || 
|-id=826 bgcolor=#fefefe
| 128826 ||  || — || September 13, 2004 || Palomar || NEAT || NYS || align=right data-sort-value="0.99" | 990 m || 
|-id=827 bgcolor=#fefefe
| 128827 ||  || — || September 13, 2004 || Palomar || NEAT || MAS || align=right | 1.3 km || 
|-id=828 bgcolor=#fefefe
| 128828 ||  || — || September 13, 2004 || Palomar || NEAT || NYS || align=right | 1.1 km || 
|-id=829 bgcolor=#d6d6d6
| 128829 ||  || — || September 15, 2004 || Kitt Peak || Spacewatch || KOR || align=right | 2.1 km || 
|-id=830 bgcolor=#E9E9E9
| 128830 ||  || — || September 15, 2004 || Kitt Peak || Spacewatch || — || align=right | 2.1 km || 
|-id=831 bgcolor=#fefefe
| 128831 ||  || — || September 15, 2004 || Kitt Peak || Spacewatch || — || align=right | 1.6 km || 
|-id=832 bgcolor=#fefefe
| 128832 ||  || — || September 13, 2004 || Socorro || LINEAR || V || align=right | 1.4 km || 
|-id=833 bgcolor=#d6d6d6
| 128833 ||  || — || September 13, 2004 || Socorro || LINEAR || — || align=right | 5.8 km || 
|-id=834 bgcolor=#E9E9E9
| 128834 ||  || — || September 13, 2004 || Socorro || LINEAR || — || align=right | 3.1 km || 
|-id=835 bgcolor=#d6d6d6
| 128835 ||  || — || September 13, 2004 || Socorro || LINEAR || EOS || align=right | 3.9 km || 
|-id=836 bgcolor=#d6d6d6
| 128836 ||  || — || September 13, 2004 || Socorro || LINEAR || EOS || align=right | 4.1 km || 
|-id=837 bgcolor=#E9E9E9
| 128837 ||  || — || September 14, 2004 || Palomar || NEAT || — || align=right | 3.6 km || 
|-id=838 bgcolor=#E9E9E9
| 128838 ||  || — || September 14, 2004 || Palomar || NEAT || — || align=right | 3.5 km || 
|-id=839 bgcolor=#E9E9E9
| 128839 ||  || — || September 14, 2004 || Palomar || NEAT || — || align=right | 4.1 km || 
|-id=840 bgcolor=#E9E9E9
| 128840 ||  || — || September 15, 2004 || Anderson Mesa || LONEOS || — || align=right | 4.1 km || 
|-id=841 bgcolor=#E9E9E9
| 128841 ||  || — || September 15, 2004 || Anderson Mesa || LONEOS || JUN || align=right | 1.6 km || 
|-id=842 bgcolor=#E9E9E9
| 128842 ||  || — || September 7, 2004 || Socorro || LINEAR || HNS || align=right | 2.2 km || 
|-id=843 bgcolor=#d6d6d6
| 128843 ||  || — || September 11, 2004 || Socorro || LINEAR || URS || align=right | 7.6 km || 
|-id=844 bgcolor=#E9E9E9
| 128844 ||  || — || September 17, 2004 || Kitt Peak || Spacewatch || — || align=right | 2.7 km || 
|-id=845 bgcolor=#d6d6d6
| 128845 ||  || — || September 17, 2004 || Socorro || LINEAR || — || align=right | 3.4 km || 
|-id=846 bgcolor=#d6d6d6
| 128846 ||  || — || September 16, 2004 || Siding Spring || SSS || VER || align=right | 6.5 km || 
|-id=847 bgcolor=#E9E9E9
| 128847 ||  || — || September 16, 2004 || Siding Spring || SSS || ADE || align=right | 4.5 km || 
|-id=848 bgcolor=#E9E9E9
| 128848 ||  || — || September 16, 2004 || Siding Spring || SSS || — || align=right | 1.9 km || 
|-id=849 bgcolor=#E9E9E9
| 128849 ||  || — || September 17, 2004 || Anderson Mesa || LONEOS || — || align=right | 2.9 km || 
|-id=850 bgcolor=#E9E9E9
| 128850 ||  || — || September 17, 2004 || Anderson Mesa || LONEOS || — || align=right | 3.1 km || 
|-id=851 bgcolor=#d6d6d6
| 128851 ||  || — || September 17, 2004 || Anderson Mesa || LONEOS || — || align=right | 3.7 km || 
|-id=852 bgcolor=#E9E9E9
| 128852 ||  || — || September 17, 2004 || Anderson Mesa || LONEOS || — || align=right | 3.6 km || 
|-id=853 bgcolor=#fefefe
| 128853 ||  || — || September 17, 2004 || Anderson Mesa || LONEOS || V || align=right | 1.3 km || 
|-id=854 bgcolor=#d6d6d6
| 128854 ||  || — || September 17, 2004 || Anderson Mesa || LONEOS || — || align=right | 5.3 km || 
|-id=855 bgcolor=#E9E9E9
| 128855 ||  || — || September 17, 2004 || Anderson Mesa || LONEOS || — || align=right | 2.8 km || 
|-id=856 bgcolor=#d6d6d6
| 128856 ||  || — || September 17, 2004 || Anderson Mesa || LONEOS || — || align=right | 5.8 km || 
|-id=857 bgcolor=#fefefe
| 128857 ||  || — || September 18, 2004 || Socorro || LINEAR || — || align=right | 1.7 km || 
|-id=858 bgcolor=#d6d6d6
| 128858 ||  || — || September 17, 2004 || Desert Eagle || W. K. Y. Yeung || SHU3:2 || align=right | 9.0 km || 
|-id=859 bgcolor=#fefefe
| 128859 ||  || — || September 16, 2004 || Kitt Peak || Spacewatch || FLO || align=right data-sort-value="0.93" | 930 m || 
|-id=860 bgcolor=#E9E9E9
| 128860 ||  || — || September 21, 2004 || Socorro || LINEAR || BRU || align=right | 6.5 km || 
|-id=861 bgcolor=#fefefe
| 128861 ||  || — || September 17, 2004 || Socorro || LINEAR || — || align=right | 1.5 km || 
|-id=862 bgcolor=#d6d6d6
| 128862 ||  || — || September 17, 2004 || Socorro || LINEAR || THM || align=right | 3.5 km || 
|-id=863 bgcolor=#E9E9E9
| 128863 ||  || — || September 17, 2004 || Socorro || LINEAR || AGN || align=right | 2.6 km || 
|-id=864 bgcolor=#d6d6d6
| 128864 ||  || — || September 17, 2004 || Socorro || LINEAR || KOR || align=right | 2.3 km || 
|-id=865 bgcolor=#E9E9E9
| 128865 ||  || — || September 17, 2004 || Socorro || LINEAR || — || align=right | 3.7 km || 
|-id=866 bgcolor=#fefefe
| 128866 ||  || — || September 17, 2004 || Socorro || LINEAR || NYS || align=right | 1.0 km || 
|-id=867 bgcolor=#d6d6d6
| 128867 ||  || — || September 17, 2004 || Socorro || LINEAR || KOR || align=right | 2.6 km || 
|-id=868 bgcolor=#fefefe
| 128868 ||  || — || September 17, 2004 || Socorro || LINEAR || — || align=right | 1.7 km || 
|-id=869 bgcolor=#d6d6d6
| 128869 ||  || — || September 17, 2004 || Socorro || LINEAR || — || align=right | 5.8 km || 
|-id=870 bgcolor=#E9E9E9
| 128870 ||  || — || September 17, 2004 || Socorro || LINEAR || — || align=right | 1.8 km || 
|-id=871 bgcolor=#d6d6d6
| 128871 ||  || — || September 17, 2004 || Socorro || LINEAR || — || align=right | 5.2 km || 
|-id=872 bgcolor=#E9E9E9
| 128872 ||  || — || September 17, 2004 || Socorro || LINEAR || — || align=right | 3.3 km || 
|-id=873 bgcolor=#fefefe
| 128873 ||  || — || September 17, 2004 || Socorro || LINEAR || — || align=right | 1.4 km || 
|-id=874 bgcolor=#E9E9E9
| 128874 ||  || — || September 17, 2004 || Anderson Mesa || LONEOS || — || align=right | 1.7 km || 
|-id=875 bgcolor=#E9E9E9
| 128875 ||  || — || September 18, 2004 || Socorro || LINEAR || — || align=right | 2.0 km || 
|-id=876 bgcolor=#E9E9E9
| 128876 ||  || — || September 18, 2004 || Socorro || LINEAR || — || align=right | 4.1 km || 
|-id=877 bgcolor=#d6d6d6
| 128877 ||  || — || September 22, 2004 || Socorro || LINEAR || — || align=right | 8.4 km || 
|-id=878 bgcolor=#d6d6d6
| 128878 ||  || — || September 22, 2004 || Socorro || LINEAR || — || align=right | 5.7 km || 
|-id=879 bgcolor=#E9E9E9
| 128879 ||  || — || September 22, 2004 || Socorro || LINEAR || MAR || align=right | 2.2 km || 
|-id=880 bgcolor=#d6d6d6
| 128880 ||  || — || September 22, 2004 || Kitt Peak || Spacewatch || — || align=right | 5.3 km || 
|-id=881 bgcolor=#fefefe
| 128881 ||  || — || September 23, 2004 || Socorro || LINEAR || — || align=right | 1.4 km || 
|-id=882 bgcolor=#fefefe
| 128882 Jennydebenedetti ||  ||  || September 22, 2004 || Goodricke-Pigott || R. A. Tucker || — || align=right | 2.4 km || 
|-id=883 bgcolor=#fefefe
| 128883 ||  || — || September 16, 2004 || Anderson Mesa || LONEOS || FLO || align=right | 1.1 km || 
|-id=884 bgcolor=#d6d6d6
| 128884 ||  || — || September 16, 2004 || Anderson Mesa || LONEOS || — || align=right | 5.2 km || 
|-id=885 bgcolor=#E9E9E9
| 128885 ||  || — || September 16, 2004 || Anderson Mesa || LONEOS || MRX || align=right | 1.9 km || 
|-id=886 bgcolor=#E9E9E9
| 128886 ||  || — || September 16, 2004 || Anderson Mesa || LONEOS || WIT || align=right | 2.5 km || 
|-id=887 bgcolor=#d6d6d6
| 128887 ||  || — || September 16, 2004 || Anderson Mesa || LONEOS || — || align=right | 4.9 km || 
|-id=888 bgcolor=#E9E9E9
| 128888 ||  || — || September 17, 2004 || Socorro || LINEAR || — || align=right | 2.8 km || 
|-id=889 bgcolor=#E9E9E9
| 128889 ||  || — || September 30, 2004 || Palomar || NEAT || — || align=right | 2.4 km || 
|-id=890 bgcolor=#E9E9E9
| 128890 ||  || — || September 18, 2004 || Socorro || LINEAR || — || align=right | 2.8 km || 
|-id=891 bgcolor=#E9E9E9
| 128891 ||  || — || September 24, 2004 || Socorro || LINEAR || — || align=right | 2.2 km || 
|-id=892 bgcolor=#fefefe
| 128892 || 2004 TH || — || October 4, 2004 || Kitt Peak || Spacewatch || MAS || align=right | 1.1 km || 
|-id=893 bgcolor=#fefefe
| 128893 || 2004 TK || — || October 3, 2004 || Goodricke-Pigott || R. A. Tucker || NYS || align=right | 1.4 km || 
|-id=894 bgcolor=#d6d6d6
| 128894 || 2004 TL || — || October 3, 2004 || Goodricke-Pigott || R. A. Tucker || CHA || align=right | 4.2 km || 
|-id=895 bgcolor=#fefefe
| 128895 Bright Spring || 2004 TW ||  || October 4, 2004 || Jarnac || Jarnac Obs. || NYS || align=right | 1.9 km || 
|-id=896 bgcolor=#E9E9E9
| 128896 ||  || — || October 4, 2004 || Kitt Peak || Spacewatch || — || align=right | 3.0 km || 
|-id=897 bgcolor=#fefefe
| 128897 ||  || — || October 4, 2004 || Kitt Peak || Spacewatch || NYS || align=right | 1.2 km || 
|-id=898 bgcolor=#d6d6d6
| 128898 ||  || — || October 3, 2004 || Palomar || NEAT || LUT || align=right | 9.5 km || 
|-id=899 bgcolor=#d6d6d6
| 128899 ||  || — || October 5, 2004 || Socorro || LINEAR || — || align=right | 2.7 km || 
|-id=900 bgcolor=#E9E9E9
| 128900 ||  || — || October 7, 2004 || Anderson Mesa || LONEOS || — || align=right | 4.3 km || 
|}

128901–129000 

|-bgcolor=#fefefe
| 128901 ||  || — || October 8, 2004 || Kitt Peak || Spacewatch || FLO || align=right data-sort-value="0.95" | 950 m || 
|-id=902 bgcolor=#d6d6d6
| 128902 ||  || — || October 11, 2004 || Kitt Peak || Spacewatch || — || align=right | 6.3 km || 
|-id=903 bgcolor=#E9E9E9
| 128903 ||  || — || October 10, 2004 || Bergisch Gladbach || W. Bickel || — || align=right | 4.0 km || 
|-id=904 bgcolor=#E9E9E9
| 128904 ||  || — || October 3, 2004 || Palomar || NEAT || — || align=right | 4.0 km || 
|-id=905 bgcolor=#E9E9E9
| 128905 ||  || — || October 3, 2004 || Palomar || NEAT || — || align=right | 2.7 km || 
|-id=906 bgcolor=#d6d6d6
| 128906 ||  || — || October 4, 2004 || Anderson Mesa || LONEOS || THMslow || align=right | 4.2 km || 
|-id=907 bgcolor=#fefefe
| 128907 ||  || — || October 4, 2004 || Anderson Mesa || LONEOS || FLO || align=right | 1.2 km || 
|-id=908 bgcolor=#d6d6d6
| 128908 ||  || — || October 4, 2004 || Kitt Peak || Spacewatch || — || align=right | 3.9 km || 
|-id=909 bgcolor=#E9E9E9
| 128909 ||  || — || October 4, 2004 || Kitt Peak || Spacewatch || — || align=right | 1.7 km || 
|-id=910 bgcolor=#d6d6d6
| 128910 ||  || — || October 4, 2004 || Kitt Peak || Spacewatch || — || align=right | 7.3 km || 
|-id=911 bgcolor=#E9E9E9
| 128911 ||  || — || October 4, 2004 || Kitt Peak || Spacewatch || — || align=right | 3.2 km || 
|-id=912 bgcolor=#E9E9E9
| 128912 ||  || — || October 4, 2004 || Kitt Peak || Spacewatch || HEN || align=right | 1.6 km || 
|-id=913 bgcolor=#E9E9E9
| 128913 ||  || — || October 4, 2004 || Kitt Peak || Spacewatch || — || align=right | 2.0 km || 
|-id=914 bgcolor=#d6d6d6
| 128914 ||  || — || October 4, 2004 || Kitt Peak || Spacewatch || — || align=right | 4.6 km || 
|-id=915 bgcolor=#fefefe
| 128915 ||  || — || October 5, 2004 || Anderson Mesa || LONEOS || — || align=right | 1.2 km || 
|-id=916 bgcolor=#fefefe
| 128916 ||  || — || October 5, 2004 || Kitt Peak || Spacewatch || NYS || align=right | 1.5 km || 
|-id=917 bgcolor=#E9E9E9
| 128917 ||  || — || October 5, 2004 || Kitt Peak || Spacewatch || — || align=right | 2.9 km || 
|-id=918 bgcolor=#d6d6d6
| 128918 ||  || — || October 5, 2004 || Anderson Mesa || LONEOS || THM || align=right | 4.0 km || 
|-id=919 bgcolor=#d6d6d6
| 128919 ||  || — || October 5, 2004 || Anderson Mesa || LONEOS || KOR || align=right | 2.6 km || 
|-id=920 bgcolor=#E9E9E9
| 128920 ||  || — || October 5, 2004 || Anderson Mesa || LONEOS || — || align=right | 3.2 km || 
|-id=921 bgcolor=#E9E9E9
| 128921 ||  || — || October 5, 2004 || Anderson Mesa || LONEOS || — || align=right | 2.1 km || 
|-id=922 bgcolor=#d6d6d6
| 128922 ||  || — || October 5, 2004 || Anderson Mesa || LONEOS || EOS || align=right | 3.8 km || 
|-id=923 bgcolor=#fefefe
| 128923 ||  || — || October 5, 2004 || Anderson Mesa || LONEOS || — || align=right | 1.5 km || 
|-id=924 bgcolor=#E9E9E9
| 128924 ||  || — || October 5, 2004 || Anderson Mesa || LONEOS || — || align=right | 3.7 km || 
|-id=925 bgcolor=#d6d6d6
| 128925 Conwell ||  ||  || October 6, 2004 || Antares || R. Holmes || — || align=right | 4.3 km || 
|-id=926 bgcolor=#d6d6d6
| 128926 ||  || — || October 6, 2004 || Palomar || NEAT || — || align=right | 5.3 km || 
|-id=927 bgcolor=#E9E9E9
| 128927 ||  || — || October 6, 2004 || Kitt Peak || Spacewatch || — || align=right | 2.3 km || 
|-id=928 bgcolor=#d6d6d6
| 128928 ||  || — || October 7, 2004 || Anderson Mesa || LONEOS || — || align=right | 6.0 km || 
|-id=929 bgcolor=#d6d6d6
| 128929 ||  || — || October 7, 2004 || Anderson Mesa || LONEOS || KOR || align=right | 3.3 km || 
|-id=930 bgcolor=#fefefe
| 128930 ||  || — || October 4, 2004 || Anderson Mesa || LONEOS || ERI || align=right | 2.8 km || 
|-id=931 bgcolor=#d6d6d6
| 128931 ||  || — || October 5, 2004 || Kitt Peak || Spacewatch || KOR || align=right | 2.1 km || 
|-id=932 bgcolor=#d6d6d6
| 128932 ||  || — || October 5, 2004 || Kitt Peak || Spacewatch || KOR || align=right | 1.8 km || 
|-id=933 bgcolor=#fefefe
| 128933 ||  || — || October 5, 2004 || Kitt Peak || Spacewatch || — || align=right | 2.0 km || 
|-id=934 bgcolor=#d6d6d6
| 128934 ||  || — || October 6, 2004 || Kitt Peak || Spacewatch || THM || align=right | 3.8 km || 
|-id=935 bgcolor=#d6d6d6
| 128935 ||  || — || October 7, 2004 || Socorro || LINEAR || — || align=right | 5.9 km || 
|-id=936 bgcolor=#E9E9E9
| 128936 ||  || — || October 7, 2004 || Socorro || LINEAR || GEF || align=right | 2.7 km || 
|-id=937 bgcolor=#d6d6d6
| 128937 ||  || — || October 7, 2004 || Anderson Mesa || LONEOS || — || align=right | 5.5 km || 
|-id=938 bgcolor=#d6d6d6
| 128938 ||  || — || October 7, 2004 || Anderson Mesa || LONEOS || THM || align=right | 4.8 km || 
|-id=939 bgcolor=#E9E9E9
| 128939 ||  || — || October 7, 2004 || Socorro || LINEAR || — || align=right | 3.4 km || 
|-id=940 bgcolor=#d6d6d6
| 128940 ||  || — || October 7, 2004 || Palomar || NEAT || — || align=right | 6.5 km || 
|-id=941 bgcolor=#d6d6d6
| 128941 ||  || — || October 5, 2004 || Palomar || NEAT || — || align=right | 4.4 km || 
|-id=942 bgcolor=#E9E9E9
| 128942 ||  || — || October 7, 2004 || Socorro || LINEAR || — || align=right | 4.4 km || 
|-id=943 bgcolor=#E9E9E9
| 128943 ||  || — || October 7, 2004 || Socorro || LINEAR || NEM || align=right | 4.2 km || 
|-id=944 bgcolor=#d6d6d6
| 128944 ||  || — || October 7, 2004 || Socorro || LINEAR || KAR || align=right | 2.2 km || 
|-id=945 bgcolor=#E9E9E9
| 128945 ||  || — || October 7, 2004 || Socorro || LINEAR || WIT || align=right | 5.1 km || 
|-id=946 bgcolor=#E9E9E9
| 128946 ||  || — || October 7, 2004 || Socorro || LINEAR || CLO || align=right | 3.9 km || 
|-id=947 bgcolor=#d6d6d6
| 128947 ||  || — || October 7, 2004 || Anderson Mesa || LONEOS || — || align=right | 6.9 km || 
|-id=948 bgcolor=#E9E9E9
| 128948 ||  || — || October 7, 2004 || Anderson Mesa || LONEOS || — || align=right | 5.0 km || 
|-id=949 bgcolor=#d6d6d6
| 128949 ||  || — || October 7, 2004 || Anderson Mesa || LONEOS || HYG || align=right | 4.8 km || 
|-id=950 bgcolor=#E9E9E9
| 128950 ||  || — || October 7, 2004 || Anderson Mesa || LONEOS || INO || align=right | 2.4 km || 
|-id=951 bgcolor=#d6d6d6
| 128951 ||  || — || October 7, 2004 || Palomar || NEAT || EOS || align=right | 3.7 km || 
|-id=952 bgcolor=#d6d6d6
| 128952 ||  || — || October 7, 2004 || Anderson Mesa || LONEOS || — || align=right | 5.5 km || 
|-id=953 bgcolor=#fefefe
| 128953 ||  || — || October 7, 2004 || Anderson Mesa || LONEOS || FLO || align=right | 1.0 km || 
|-id=954 bgcolor=#d6d6d6
| 128954 ||  || — || October 7, 2004 || Palomar || NEAT || — || align=right | 6.0 km || 
|-id=955 bgcolor=#fefefe
| 128955 ||  || — || October 7, 2004 || Palomar || NEAT || FLO || align=right | 1.4 km || 
|-id=956 bgcolor=#d6d6d6
| 128956 ||  || — || October 7, 2004 || Palomar || NEAT || — || align=right | 5.4 km || 
|-id=957 bgcolor=#fefefe
| 128957 ||  || — || October 8, 2004 || Anderson Mesa || LONEOS || NYS || align=right | 1.1 km || 
|-id=958 bgcolor=#fefefe
| 128958 ||  || — || October 8, 2004 || Anderson Mesa || LONEOS || — || align=right | 1.6 km || 
|-id=959 bgcolor=#E9E9E9
| 128959 ||  || — || October 8, 2004 || Anderson Mesa || LONEOS || — || align=right | 2.7 km || 
|-id=960 bgcolor=#fefefe
| 128960 ||  || — || October 4, 2004 || Kitt Peak || Spacewatch || FLO || align=right | 1.2 km || 
|-id=961 bgcolor=#d6d6d6
| 128961 ||  || — || October 4, 2004 || Kitt Peak || Spacewatch || HYG || align=right | 5.4 km || 
|-id=962 bgcolor=#E9E9E9
| 128962 ||  || — || October 5, 2004 || Kitt Peak || Spacewatch || HEN || align=right | 1.7 km || 
|-id=963 bgcolor=#d6d6d6
| 128963 ||  || — || October 5, 2004 || Kitt Peak || Spacewatch || — || align=right | 3.8 km || 
|-id=964 bgcolor=#fefefe
| 128964 ||  || — || October 5, 2004 || Kitt Peak || Spacewatch || V || align=right | 1.3 km || 
|-id=965 bgcolor=#fefefe
| 128965 ||  || — || October 6, 2004 || Kitt Peak || Spacewatch || — || align=right | 1.3 km || 
|-id=966 bgcolor=#d6d6d6
| 128966 ||  || — || October 6, 2004 || Kitt Peak || Spacewatch || — || align=right | 3.9 km || 
|-id=967 bgcolor=#fefefe
| 128967 ||  || — || October 6, 2004 || Kitt Peak || Spacewatch || NYS || align=right | 1.1 km || 
|-id=968 bgcolor=#d6d6d6
| 128968 ||  || — || October 6, 2004 || Kitt Peak || Spacewatch || — || align=right | 7.0 km || 
|-id=969 bgcolor=#E9E9E9
| 128969 ||  || — || October 6, 2004 || Kitt Peak || Spacewatch || HEN || align=right | 1.5 km || 
|-id=970 bgcolor=#d6d6d6
| 128970 ||  || — || October 6, 2004 || Kitt Peak || Spacewatch || KOR || align=right | 1.7 km || 
|-id=971 bgcolor=#fefefe
| 128971 ||  || — || October 6, 2004 || Kitt Peak || Spacewatch || V || align=right | 1.2 km || 
|-id=972 bgcolor=#fefefe
| 128972 ||  || — || October 7, 2004 || Kitt Peak || Spacewatch || — || align=right | 2.2 km || 
|-id=973 bgcolor=#E9E9E9
| 128973 ||  || — || October 7, 2004 || Kitt Peak || Spacewatch || — || align=right | 2.4 km || 
|-id=974 bgcolor=#d6d6d6
| 128974 ||  || — || October 7, 2004 || Socorro || LINEAR || — || align=right | 5.3 km || 
|-id=975 bgcolor=#d6d6d6
| 128975 ||  || — || October 8, 2004 || Socorro || LINEAR || — || align=right | 5.1 km || 
|-id=976 bgcolor=#E9E9E9
| 128976 ||  || — || October 8, 2004 || Socorro || LINEAR || — || align=right | 2.9 km || 
|-id=977 bgcolor=#d6d6d6
| 128977 ||  || — || October 9, 2004 || Socorro || LINEAR || — || align=right | 3.8 km || 
|-id=978 bgcolor=#fefefe
| 128978 ||  || — || October 9, 2004 || Socorro || LINEAR || — || align=right | 1.5 km || 
|-id=979 bgcolor=#E9E9E9
| 128979 ||  || — || October 7, 2004 || Kitt Peak || Spacewatch || — || align=right | 1.4 km || 
|-id=980 bgcolor=#E9E9E9
| 128980 ||  || — || October 7, 2004 || Kitt Peak || Spacewatch || — || align=right | 2.5 km || 
|-id=981 bgcolor=#d6d6d6
| 128981 ||  || — || October 7, 2004 || Kitt Peak || Spacewatch || — || align=right | 4.2 km || 
|-id=982 bgcolor=#d6d6d6
| 128982 ||  || — || October 7, 2004 || Kitt Peak || Spacewatch || — || align=right | 5.3 km || 
|-id=983 bgcolor=#d6d6d6
| 128983 ||  || — || October 7, 2004 || Kitt Peak || Spacewatch || — || align=right | 3.1 km || 
|-id=984 bgcolor=#d6d6d6
| 128984 ||  || — || October 7, 2004 || Kitt Peak || Spacewatch || — || align=right | 4.4 km || 
|-id=985 bgcolor=#d6d6d6
| 128985 ||  || — || October 7, 2004 || Kitt Peak || Spacewatch || — || align=right | 4.1 km || 
|-id=986 bgcolor=#d6d6d6
| 128986 ||  || — || October 7, 2004 || Kitt Peak || Spacewatch || — || align=right | 4.8 km || 
|-id=987 bgcolor=#d6d6d6
| 128987 ||  || — || October 7, 2004 || Kitt Peak || Spacewatch || THM || align=right | 4.5 km || 
|-id=988 bgcolor=#fefefe
| 128988 ||  || — || October 8, 2004 || Kitt Peak || Spacewatch || FLO || align=right | 2.6 km || 
|-id=989 bgcolor=#d6d6d6
| 128989 ||  || — || October 8, 2004 || Kitt Peak || Spacewatch || THM || align=right | 3.8 km || 
|-id=990 bgcolor=#d6d6d6
| 128990 ||  || — || October 8, 2004 || Kitt Peak || Spacewatch || — || align=right | 4.1 km || 
|-id=991 bgcolor=#d6d6d6
| 128991 ||  || — || October 8, 2004 || Kitt Peak || Spacewatch || — || align=right | 3.6 km || 
|-id=992 bgcolor=#d6d6d6
| 128992 ||  || — || October 14, 2004 || Kitt Peak || Spacewatch || — || align=right | 4.4 km || 
|-id=993 bgcolor=#d6d6d6
| 128993 ||  || — || October 7, 2004 || Socorro || LINEAR || — || align=right | 6.4 km || 
|-id=994 bgcolor=#fefefe
| 128994 ||  || — || October 8, 2004 || Kitt Peak || Spacewatch || NYS || align=right | 1.9 km || 
|-id=995 bgcolor=#E9E9E9
| 128995 ||  || — || October 8, 2004 || Kitt Peak || Spacewatch || — || align=right | 2.0 km || 
|-id=996 bgcolor=#d6d6d6
| 128996 ||  || — || October 8, 2004 || Socorro || LINEAR || EOS || align=right | 3.6 km || 
|-id=997 bgcolor=#E9E9E9
| 128997 ||  || — || October 6, 2004 || Socorro || LINEAR || — || align=right | 3.2 km || 
|-id=998 bgcolor=#d6d6d6
| 128998 ||  || — || October 6, 2004 || Socorro || LINEAR || — || align=right | 5.4 km || 
|-id=999 bgcolor=#d6d6d6
| 128999 ||  || — || October 7, 2004 || Socorro || LINEAR || — || align=right | 5.5 km || 
|-id=000 bgcolor=#E9E9E9
| 129000 ||  || — || October 7, 2004 || Socorro || LINEAR || — || align=right | 2.0 km || 
|}

References

External links 
 Discovery Circumstances: Numbered Minor Planets (125001)–(130000) (IAU Minor Planet Center)

0128